= VAG Class DT2 =

German U-Bahn train type operated in Nuremberg

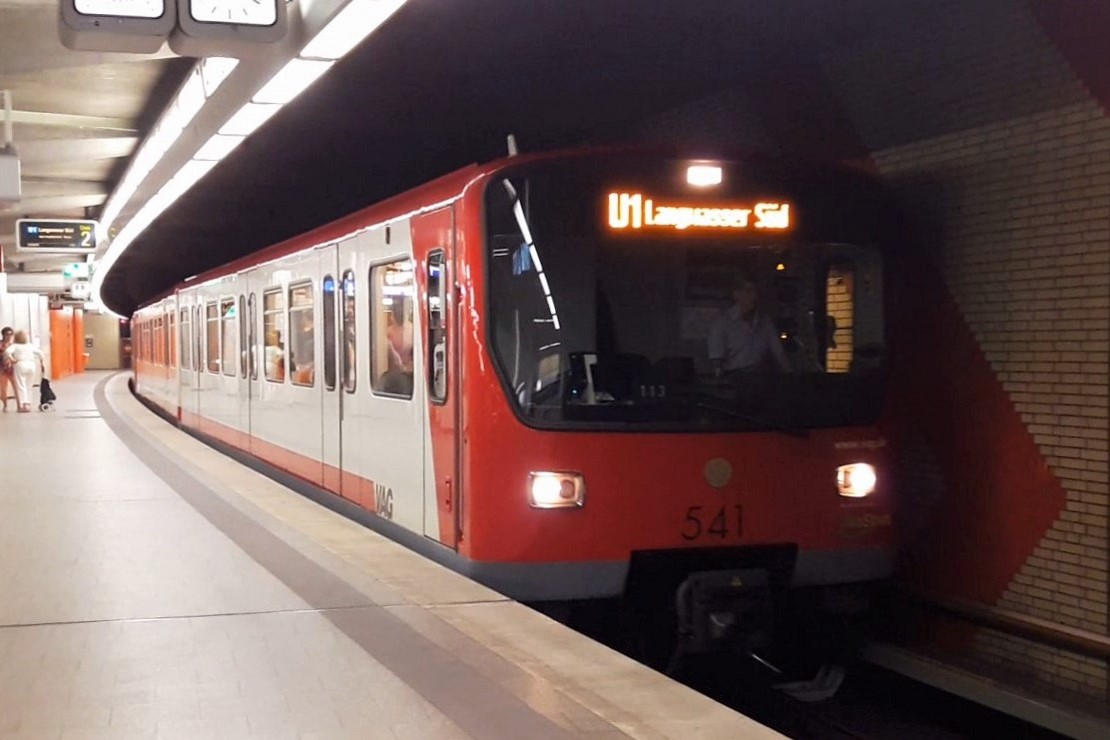
- A DT2 train at Plärrer station in August 2016
- Manufacturer: MAN
- Constructed: 1993–1994
- Number built: 24 vehicles (12 sets)
- Successor: G1
- Formation: 2 cars per trainset
- Fleet numbers: 529/530–551/552
- Capacity: 290 (82 seated)
- Operators: VAG

Specifications
- Car body construction: Aluminium
- Train length: 37,500 mm (123 ft 0 in)
- Width: 2,900 mm (9 ft 6 in)
- Doors: 3 pairs per side
- Maximum speed: 80 km/h (50 mph)
- Weight: 55 t
- Traction system: Three-phase chopper control
- Power output: 876 kW
- Electric system(s): 750 V DC Third rail
- Current collection: contact shoe pantograph (maintenance only)
- Braking system(s): Resistor brake, pneumatic brake, spring accumulator brake
- Track gauge: 1,435 mm (4 ft 8 1/2 in)

The VAG Class DT2 is an electric multiple unit (EMU) train type operated by the Verkehrs-Aktiengesellschaft Nürnberg on the Nuremberg U-Bahn system. It is a derivative of the MVG Class B, in service on the Munich U-Bahn since 1981.

== Formation ==
Every DT2 train consists of two permanently-coupled cars, forming a twin-unit.

Numbering	xxx	xxx+1
Capacity (total/seated)	145/41	145/41
Weight (t)	55	

== Interior ==
Seating accommodation consists of transverse seating bays with ergonomically shaped seats. The interior features less seating spaces than the interior of the VAG Class DT1, in order to provide more space for luggage and standing passengers.

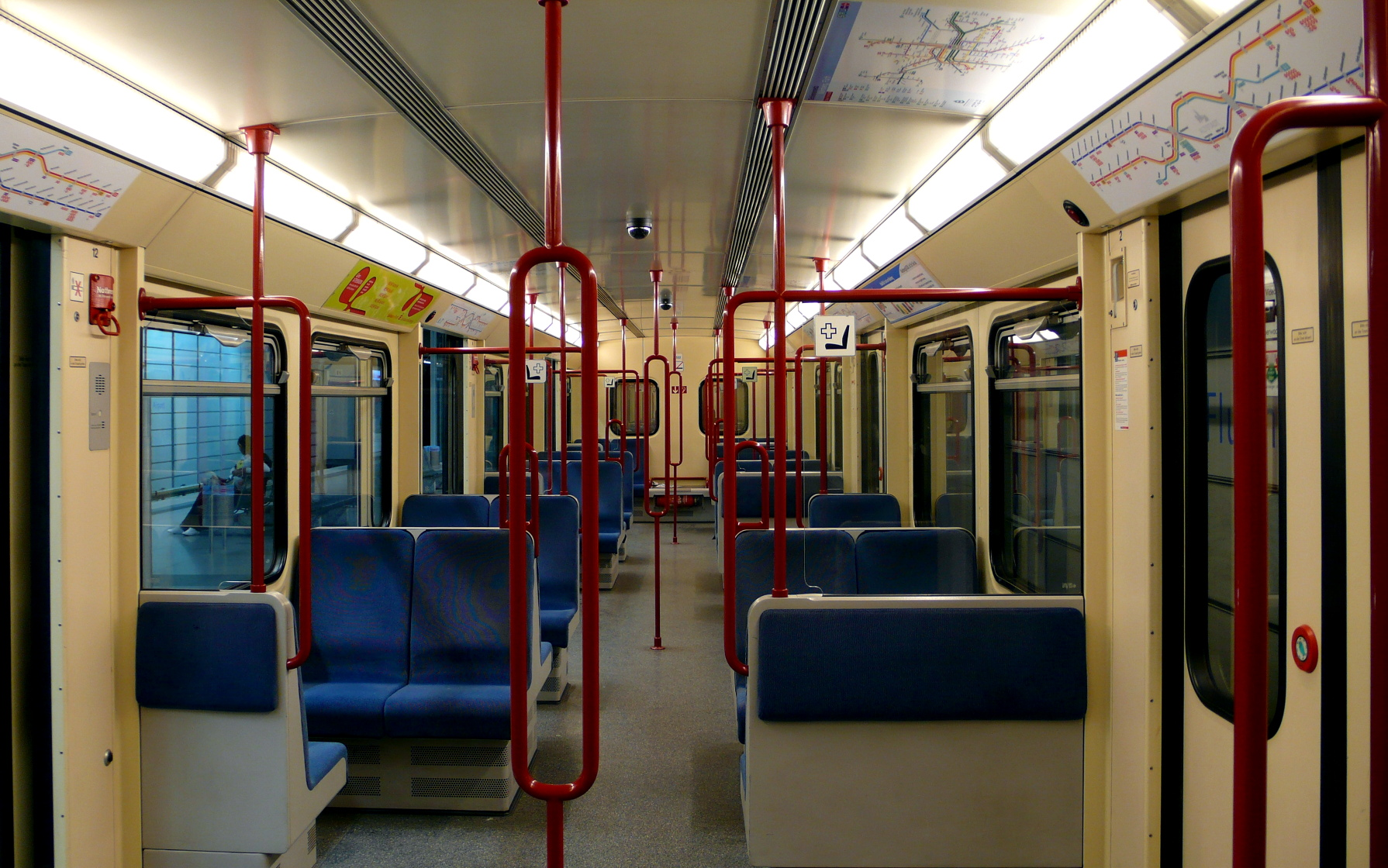
Interior view

== Technical specifications ==
The design is derived from the MVG Class B. The car bodies are made out of aluminium, and the trains are powered by three-phase motors. Unlike its predecessor DT1 and the related Class B, the three-phase motors of the DT2 are arranged transverse to the direction of travel. Besides the power supply by contact shoes, every unit is also equipped with a pantograph, as parts of the maintenance facilities are electrified with overhead lines.

== History ==
As a further order of DT1 trains was deemed unpractical due to the age of the technical design, a newly developed train type was ordered. Twelve sets were built by MAN between 1993 and 1994.

The order of 21 VAG Class G1 trains from Siemens included an option for six additional sets, which replaced the DT2 trains.
