= Plug door =

Door that seals itself using pressure difference

Plug door with cross-section

A plug door is a door designed to seal itself by taking advantage of pressure difference on its two sides and is typically used on aircraft with cabin pressurization. The higher pressure on one side forces the usually wedge-shaped door into its socket to create a seal, which prevents it from being opened until the pressure is equalised on both sides. A non-plug door relies on the strength of the locking mechanism to keep the door shut.

== Aircraft ==
Plug doors are often used on aircraft with pressurized cabins because this design of door provides a simple and reliable means of securing the door and preventing leakage of air. As the air pressure outside becomes increasingly lower than that inside the cabin, the pressure difference causes the door to seal itself closed and prevent leakage. The region of the fuselage around the opening for the door must be reinforced and this adds weight, so for large doors an alternative to the plug design is commonly used.

On some aircraft, a complex hinge design allows half the door to open inward like a plug door, and the other half to open outward. Initially the door can be rotated to fit through the opening for the non-plug half so the whole door then opens outward; this is called a semi-plug door. Alternatively, the door may have locking hinged panels at the top and bottom edges that can make it smaller than the opening, so it may be swung outward.

Plug doors are used on most pressurized airliners, particularly for emergency exits and small passenger doors. However, since plug doors must open inward, the plug design is disadvantageous for large doors. Semi-plug doors are often used for the main passenger doors. For large cargo doors, if the door were to be swung inside the fuselage, it would prevent valuable cargo being loaded into the large space it would occupy. These doors usually open outward using a secure locking mechanism with multiple pins or hatch dogs to prevent opening while in flight with a large outward-facing pressure differential. This design of door can be lighter than a plug door of the same dimensions due to the need for reinforcing the opening around a plug door.

A door plug, not to be confused with a plug door, is used in some of Boeing's 737-900ER and MAX 9s instead of an actual emergency exit door. It can be removed outwards for maintenance and requires stop pads on the airframe as well as stop fittings on the door panel to prevent outward movement during operation. This did not prevent the door plug from detaching on Alaska Airlines Flight 1282 on January 5, 2024, which has been attributed to missing bolts in the upper guide fittings and the lower hinge assemblies.

== Passenger trains ==
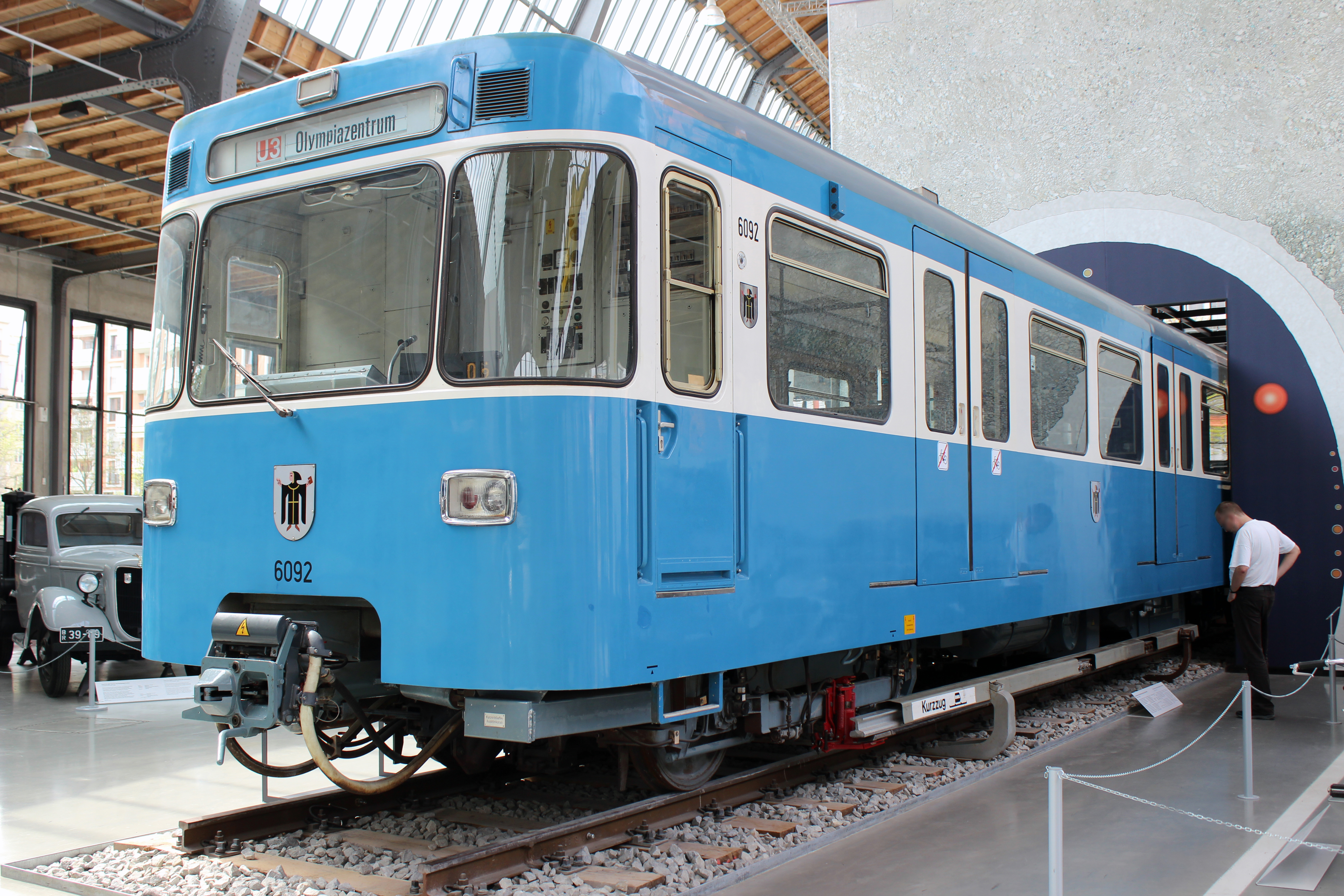
The MVG Class A of the Munich U-Bahn uses sliding plug doors.

Many passenger trains in the world use sliding plug doors: early examples of passenger trains using plug doors include the MVG Class A of the Munich U-Bahn from 1967, the first batch of trains for Line 2 of the Milan Metro from 1970, and the DT1 of the Nuremberg U-Bahn, also from 1970.

Recent examples of trains with plug doors include the KTX-Eum high-speed train, the Gautrain commuter train, and the E-class tram in Melbourne.

== Spacecraft ==
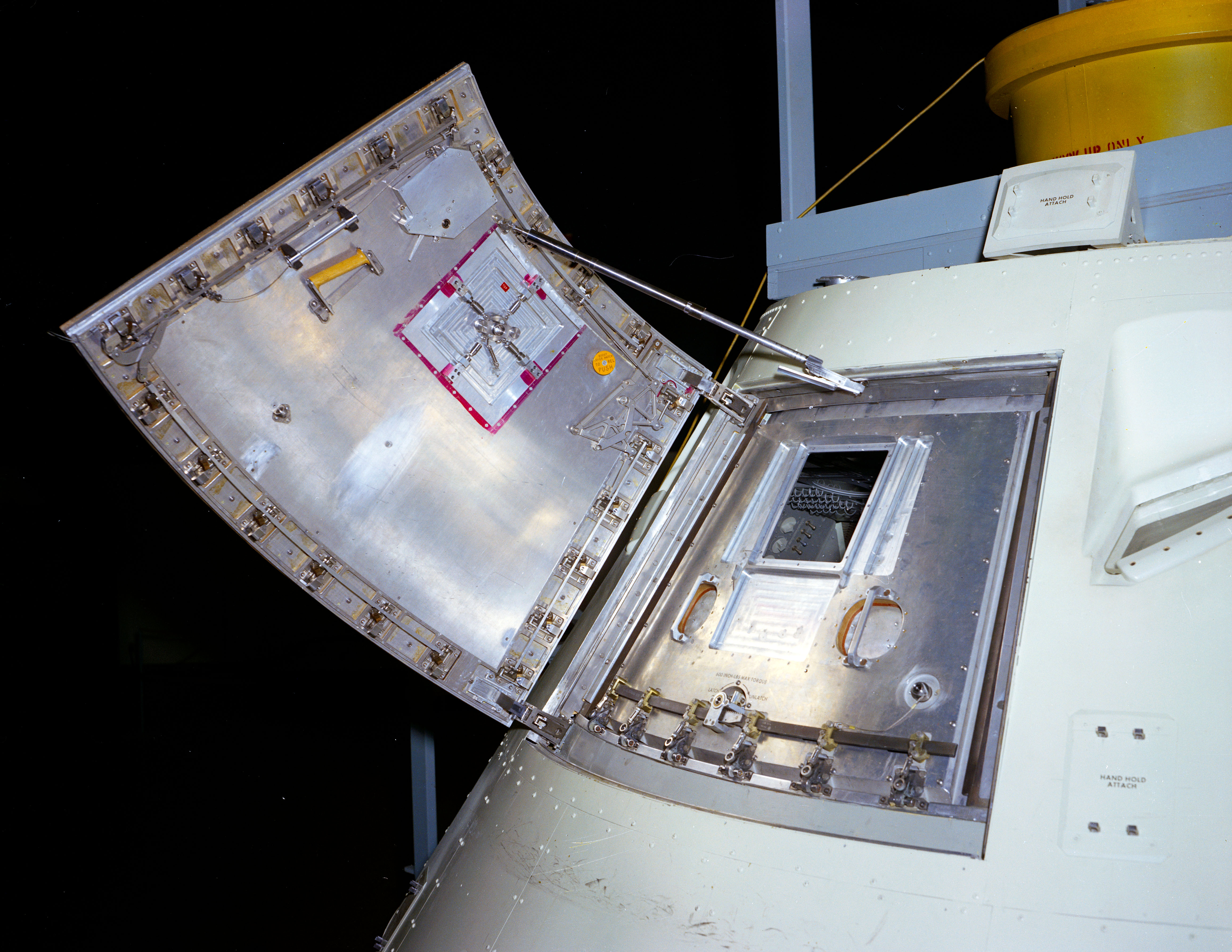
Apollo 1 plug hatch in place, with external heat shield hatch open

An inward opening plug hatch design was used on the Block I Apollo Command Module, because the explosive-release hatch of Gus Grissom's Mercury capsule Liberty Bell 7 prematurely blew at the end of the flight, causing the capsule to sink in the Atlantic Ocean and nearly resulting in Grissom's drowning. The Apollo cabin was pressurized at launch to 2 pounds per square inch (14 kPa) above standard sea level pressure, which sealed the hatch. A cabin fire during a 1967 Apollo 1 ground test raised the pressure even higher (29 pounds per square inch (200 kPa)), and made the hatch impossible to remove for the crew to escape. This killed Grissom along with his entire crew, Edward H. White and Roger Chaffee. Because of this, NASA decided to change to a quick-release, outward opening hatch on the Command Module.

Plug hatches were retained for the CM docking hatch and the two hatches on the Apollo Lunar Module, as the risk of fire in the low-pressure (5 pounds per square inch (34 kPa)) in-space atmosphere was much lower. Plug hatches were also used for the inner airlock hatch on the Space Shuttle. Currently, they are used on the International Space Station, as well as on the hatch between the Orbital Module and Descent Module of the Russian Soyuz spacecraft.

== Deep-sea vehicles ==
Deep-submergence vehicles such as the Alvin use a plug hatch which is sealed inward by the pressure of the ocean water.
