= MVG Class B =

German U-Bahn train type operated in Munich

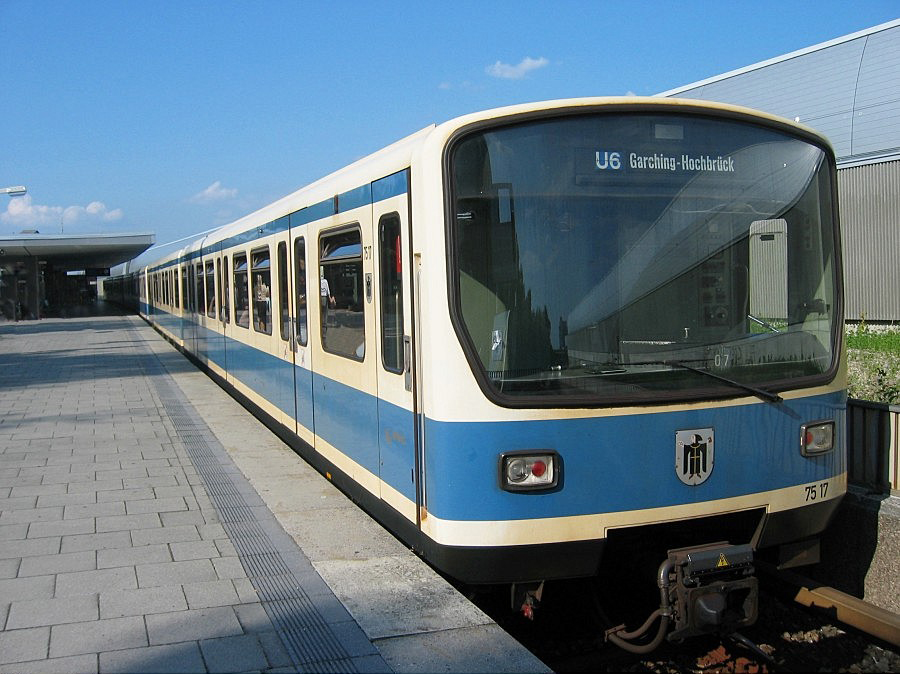
- MVG Class B train at Freimann station in July 2006
- In service: 1981–Present
- Manufacturers: MAN, MBB, DWA
- Constructed: 1981–1995
- Scrapped: 2006–
- Number built: 126 vehicles (63 sets)
- Number in service: 114 vehicles (57 sets)
- Number preserved: 1 vehicle (Note: Front third of the car only.)
- Number scrapped: 10 vehicles (5 sets)
- Formation: 2 cars per trainset
- Fleet numbers: 494–499, 501–535, 551–572
- Capacity: 290 (98 seated, 192 standing)
- Operator: MVG

Specifications
- Car body construction: Aluminium
- Train length: 37.55 m (123 ft 2 in)
- Car length: 18.2 m (59 ft 9 in)
- Width: 2.9 m (9 ft 6 in)
- Height: 3.55 m (11 ft 8 in)
- Doors: 3 pairs per side
- Maximum speed: 80 km/h (50 mph)
- Weight: 57 / 57,1 t
- Traction system: Three-phase chopper control
- Power output: 872 kW
- Transmission: Double-joint cardan drive
- Auxiliaries: 110 V Vehicle battery
- Electric system: 750 V DC third rail
- Current collection: HK 042 005 contact shoe
- Bogies: MAN DA 81
- Braking systems: Electric brake, pneumatic brake, spring accumulator brake
- Safety system: LZB
- Coupling system: Scharfenberg 40-3507
- Track gauge: 1,435 mm (4 ft 8 1/2 in)

The MVG Class B is an electric multiple unit (EMU) train type operated by the Münchner Verkehrsgesellschaft on the Munich U-Bahn system. The prototypes were delivered in 1981, and the full-production units from 1987. A derivative of the Class B, the VAG Class DT2, was in service on the Nuremberg U-Bahn system until 2022.

== Formation ==
Every Class B train consists of two permanently-coupled cars, forming a twin-unit. The car at the northern end is numbered 6xxx, while the car at the southern end is numbered 7xxx. The trains are equipped with automatic Scharfenberg couplers, enabling operation of up to three units together to form a six-car train.

The Class B was delivered in three batches:

- B1.4: prototype units, fleet numbers 494–499, delivered in 1981
- B2.7: full production units, fleet numbers 501–535, delivered from 1987
- B2.8: full production units, fleet numbers 551–572, delivered from 1994

The B2.8 series differs from the earlier series, as they have flip-dot display destination signs instead of split-flap display signs on the B1.4 and B2.7 series.

=== B1 series ===
The prototype units were ordered in 1979 and delivered in 1981. Initially the prototype units couldn't operate in multiple with full production trains due to differences of their electrical systems. Between 1992 and 1995, the electrical systems of the prototype units were modified to match the full production units, which enabled unrestricted multiple working.

Car	northern	southern
Designation	B1a	B1b
Numbering	649x	749x
Capacity (total/seated)	145/49	145/49
Weight (t)	57	

=== B2 series ===
The first full production B2.7 units were ordered in 1986, with deliveries beginning in 1987. Further units, classified as B2.8, were built by Deutsche Waggonbau AG (DWA) in 1994 and 1995.

Car	northern	southern
Designation	B2a	B2b
Numbering	65xx	75xx
Capacity (total/seated)	145/49	145/49
Weight (t)	57,1	

== Interior ==
The interior of the Class B is largely similar to the interior of its predecessor, the MVG Class A, consisting of transverse seating bays in 2+2 configuration, providing seating space for 98 passengers, with additional standing space for 192 passengers per twin unit. The seat covers are brown-colored, instead of blue-colored seat covers of the Class A interior. Compared to its predecessor, the Class B features an improved thermal insulated and soundproofed floor. Heating and ventilation of the passenger compartment are automatically controlled by thermostat.

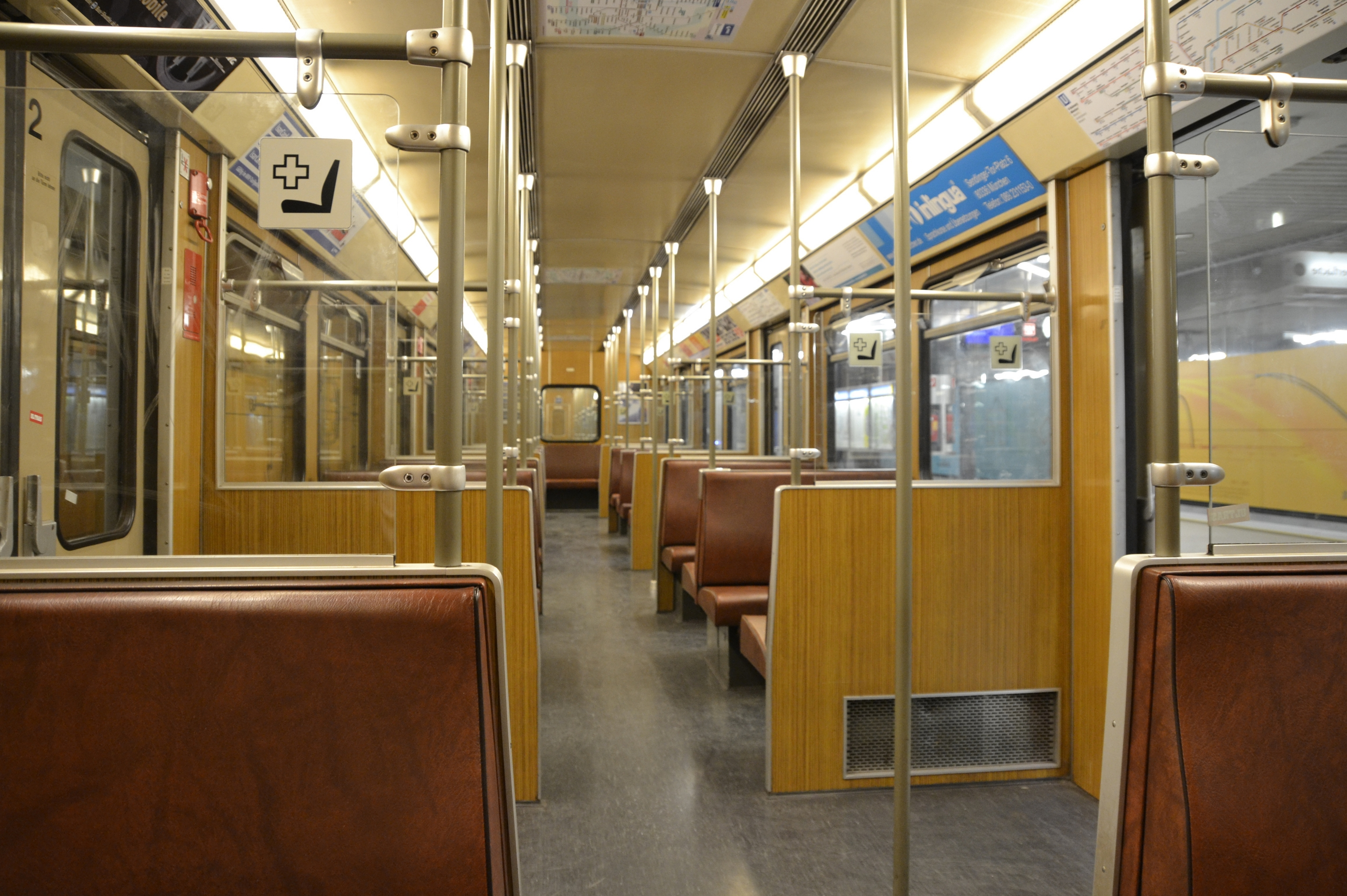
Interior of a Class B train

== Technical specifications ==
The car bodies are made out of aluminium, and the doors and windows are arranged similar to those of the Class A. The trains feature a new front end design with one large front window, instead of the three smaller front windows of the Class A. As most platforms on the Munich U-Bahn network are located on the left side in direction of travel, the driving cab controls are placed on the left side of the cab. Each unit has four electrically connected contact shoes, which are fitted on each side of the outer bogies. The Class B trains are powered by chopper-controlled three-phase-asynchronous motors with regenerative brakes. One twin-unit has four powered bogies with a power output of 218 kW, bringing the total power output to 872 kW.

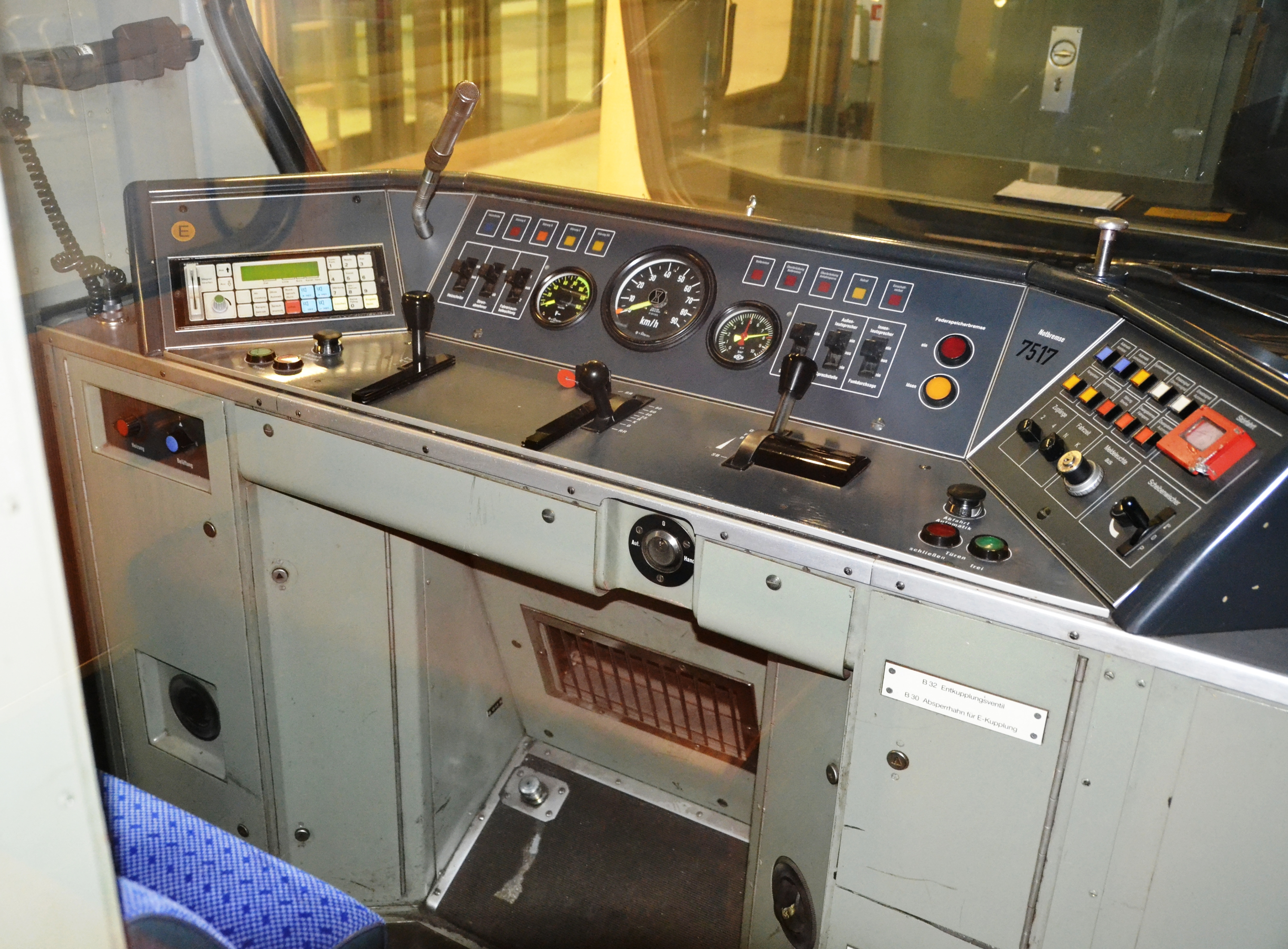
Off-center driving control of a Class B train

=== Syntegra ===
In 2006, Siemens bought prototype unit 498 and refitted the southern-end car 7498 with Syntegra-bogies to create a demonstration vehicle. Car 6498 was fitted with its regular bogies and served as reference in order to compare the "Syntegra" design to the current bogie design. The unit has been tested at the Test- and Validationcenter Wegberg-Wildenrath in North Rhine-Westphalia, and entered revenue service on August 13, 2008. When in service, this unit formed the middle unit in a three-unit train. The unit was slated for withdrawal since late 2010. After the removal of all reusable parts, the car bodies of unit 498 were sold to the Bahnwärter Thiel in October 2018, where they will be repurposed as a cafeteria and workspaces.

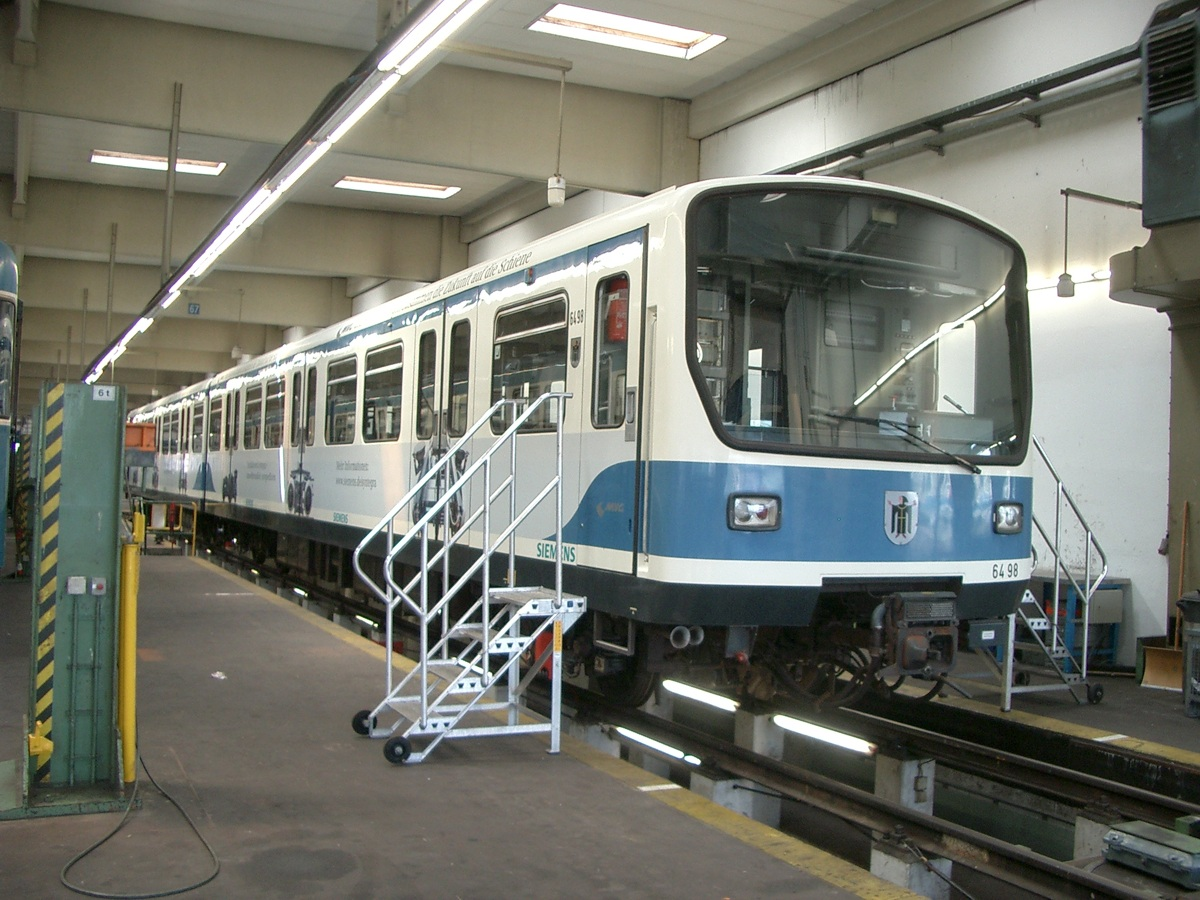
Unit 498 with Syntegra advertisement

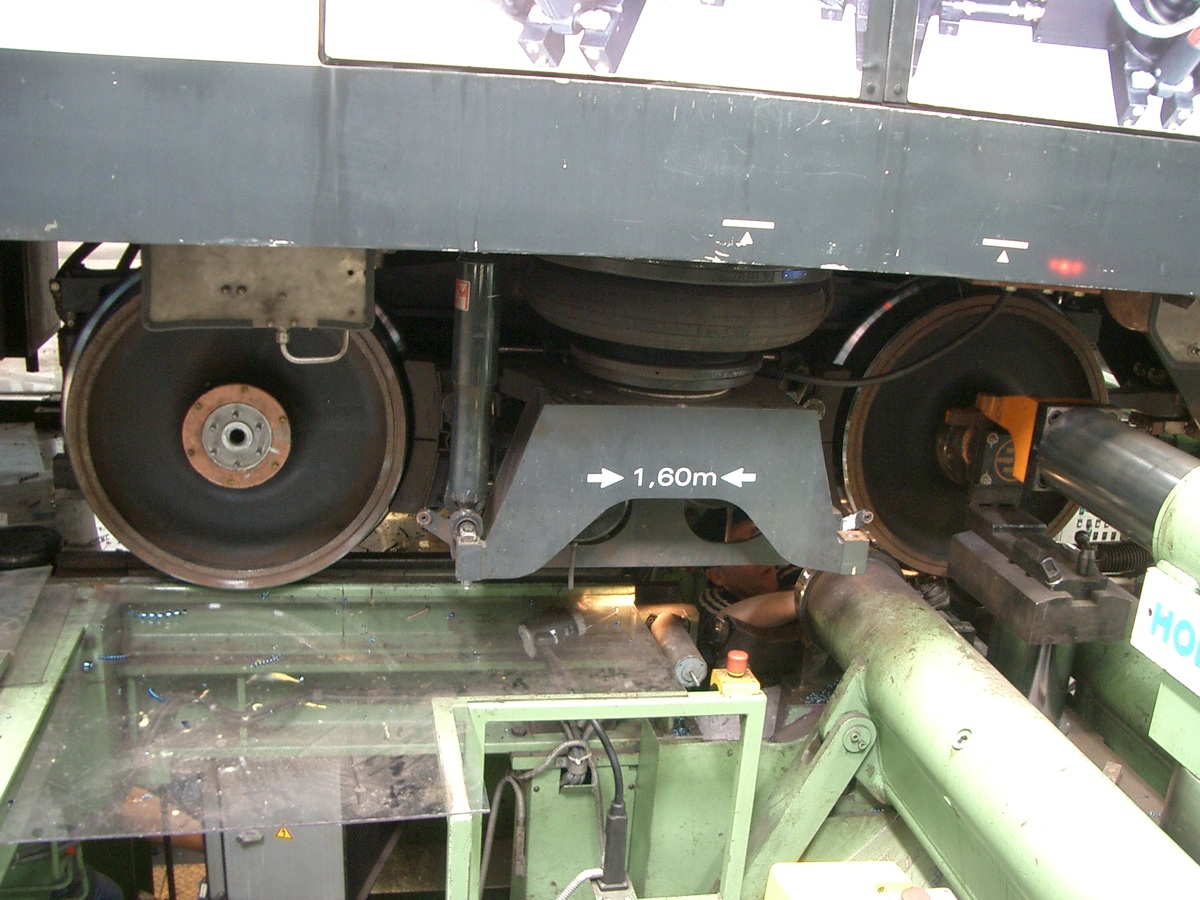
Syntegra bogie of car 7498

== History ==
Due to planned network expansions in the 1980s and the resulting higher demand of rolling stock, Stadtwerke München (Munich City Utilities), which operated the U-Bahn until 2001, decided to purchase newly developed trains, since the technology used in the Class A trains was outdated by 1980. Six prototype units (12 cars), built by Messerschmitt-Bölkow-Blohm (MBB), were delivered in 1981. Difficulties with the prototypes led to the order of additional Class A trains in 1982, as the design of the Class B wasn't ready for serial production yet. The first full-production Class B trains, built by MAN and MBB, were delivered in 1987. A total of 63 twin-units have been built between 1981 and 1995, of which 57 units are still in service as of 2021.

== Preserved examples ==
- Unit 497: Preserved at the MVG-Museum in Munich (car 7497, renumbered to 6497, front third only)
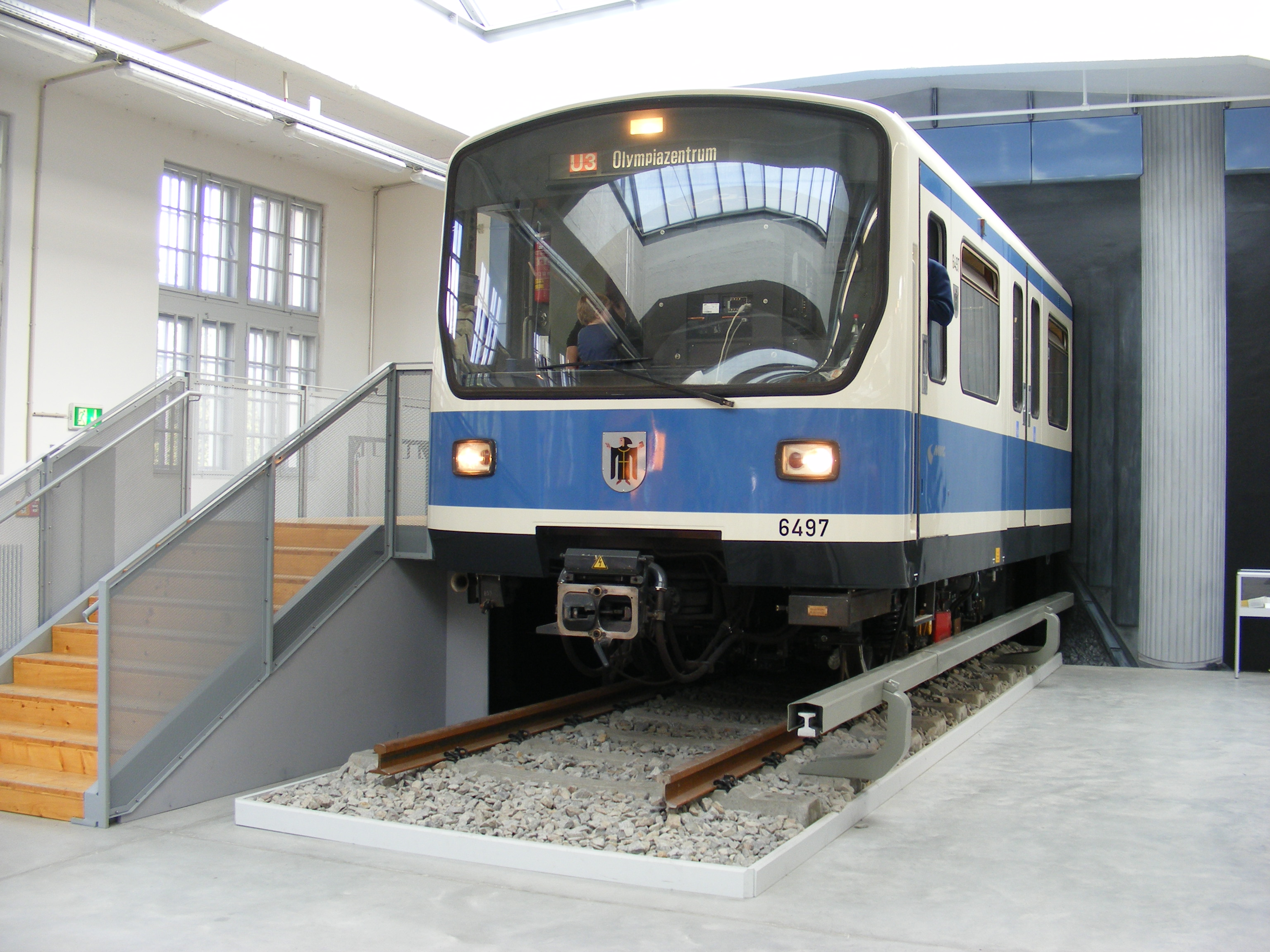
Cab section of car 7497 (renumbered to 6497) at the MVG-Museum
