= VAG Class G1 =

Type of U-Bahn train in Nuremberg, Germany

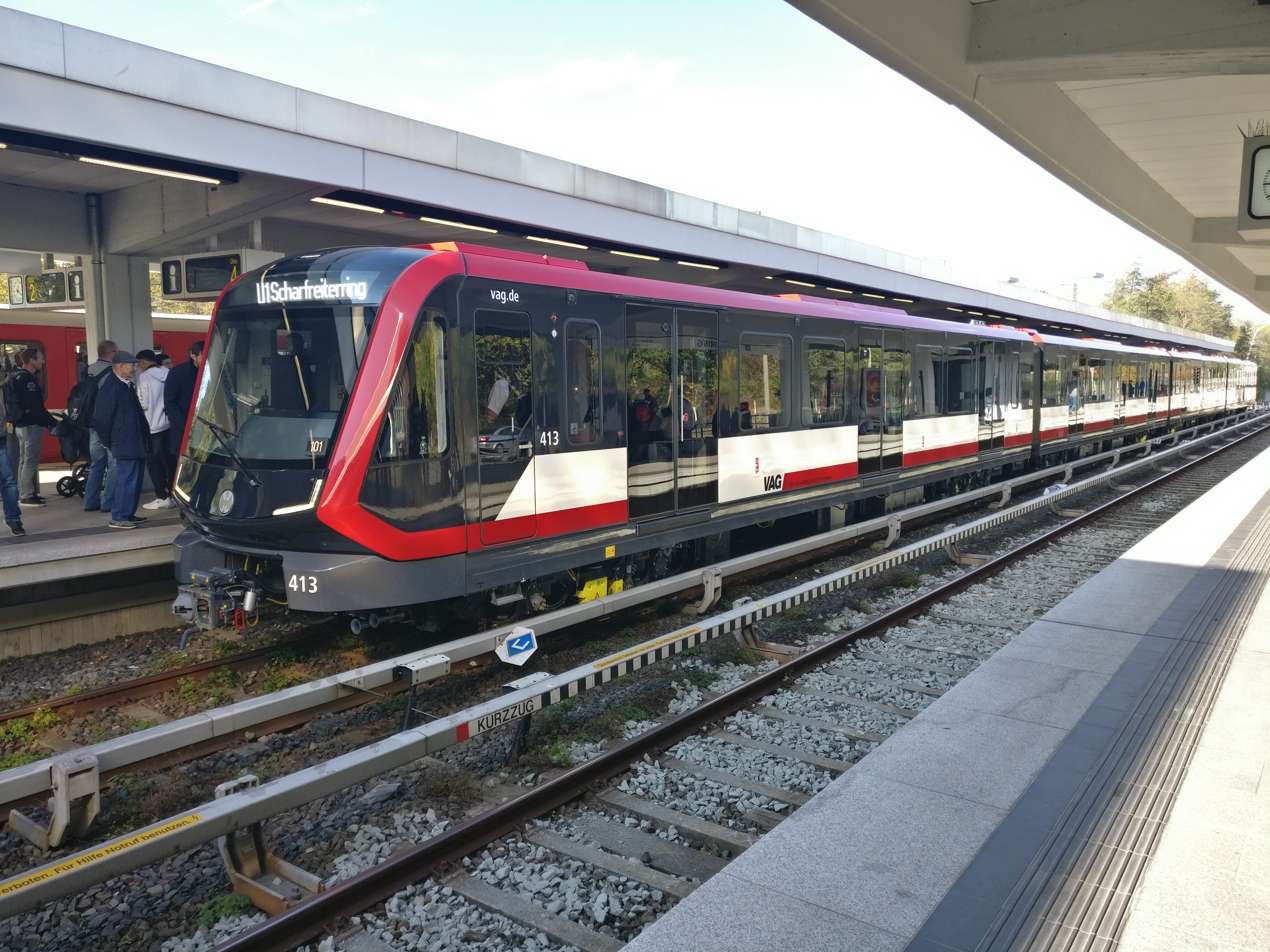
- A G1 train in October 2019

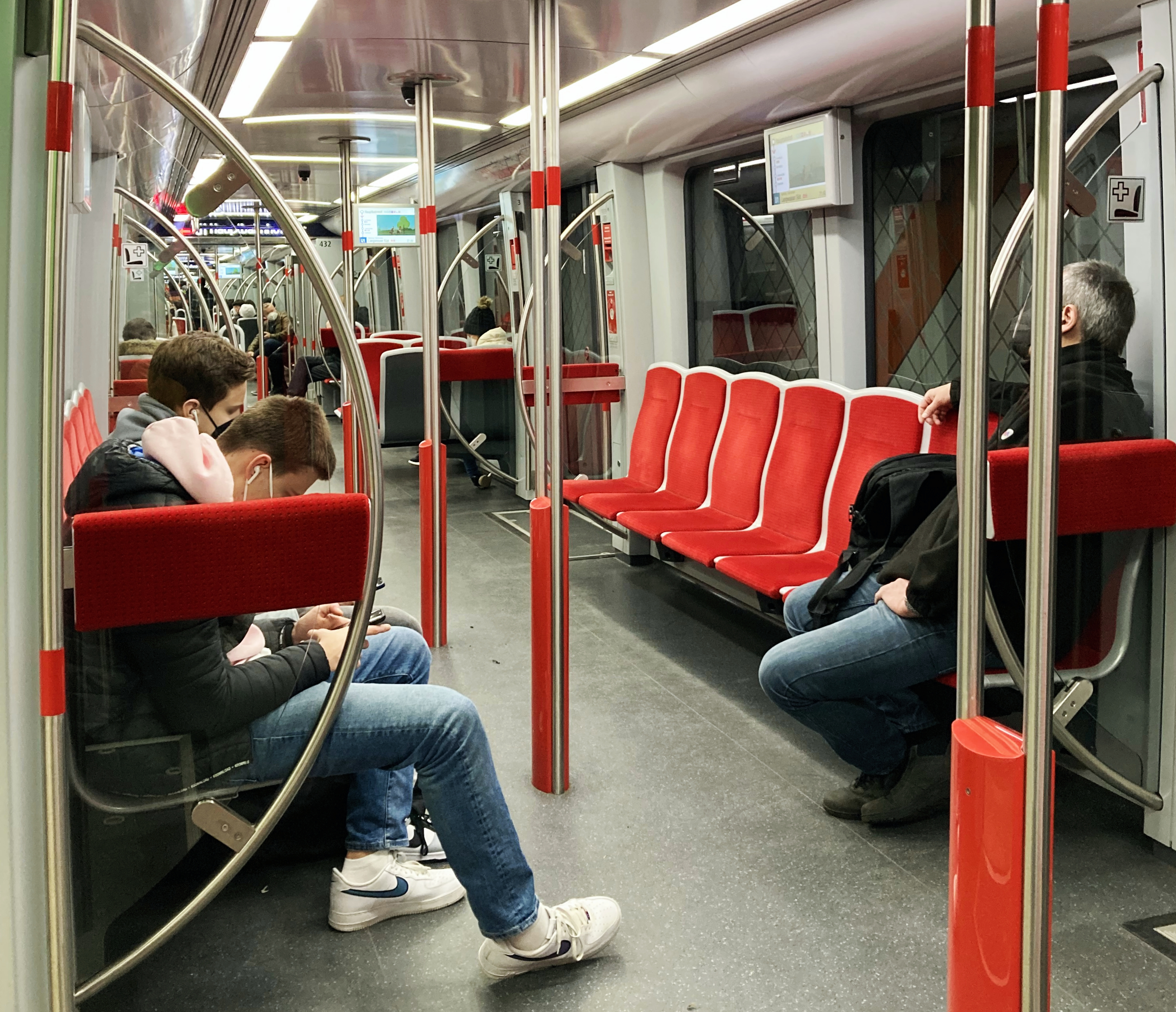
- Interior view
- Manufacturer: Siemens
- Designer: ergon3Design
- Family name: Inspiro
- Replaced: DT1 and DT2
- Constructed: 2017–2020
- Entered service: 2020–2022
- Number built: 140 carriages (35 sets)
- Number in service: 140 carriages (35 sets)
- Formation: 4-car sets
- Fleet numbers: 401–540
- Capacity: 128/476 (seated/standing)
- Operator: VAG

Specifications
- Car body construction: Welded aluminium
- Train length: 75,885 mm (248 ft 11.6 in) over couplers
- Width: 2.9 m (9 ft 6 in)
- Height: 3,576 mm (11 ft 8.8 in)
- Floor height: 1.05 m (3 ft 5 in) above top of rail
- Doors: 1.4 m (4 ft 7 in) sliding-plug, 2 × 3 per car
- Maximum speed: 80 km/h (50 mph)
- Axle load: 12.8 t (12.6 long tons; 14.1 short tons)
- Traction system: Siemens IGBT–VVVF
- Traction motors: 16 × 140 kW (190 hp)
- Power output: 2.24 MW (3,000 hp)
- Acceleration: 1.3 m/s^{2} (4.3 ft/s^{2})
- Electric systems: 750 V DC third rail
- Current collection: Contact shoe
- UIC classification: Bo′Bo′+Bo′Bo′+Bo′Bo′+Bo′Bo′
- Coupling system: Scharfenberg
- Track gauge: 1,435 mm (4 ft 8 1/2 in) standard gauge

Notes/references
- Sourced from except where noted.

The VAG Class G1 is an electric multiple unit (EMU) train type operated by the Verkehrs-Aktiengesellschaft Nürnberg on the Nuremberg U-Bahn system. They have replaced the VAG Class DT1 and VAG Class DT2 previously in service on Nuremberg U-Bahn line U1. On 20 August 2020, the first of three G1 trains entered into the revenue service.

== Formation ==
The G1 trains consist of four permanently-coupled cars, which are connected by gangways, allowing passengers to walk through the whole train. Unlike previous classes of Nuremberg U-Bahn rolling stock, the G1 is a single four-car train whereas the previous classes were all composed of two cars (DT stands for Doppeltriebwagen in German, roughly equivalent to married pair).

== Interior ==
The interior features LED lighting, CCTV security cameras, multi-purpose areas for strollers and wheelchairs, and air conditioning. Free Wi-Fi will be provided in the trains. While planned to only be used on the non-automated U1, the trains are capable of automated operation and the operator cabin is removable should they be used on automated lines in the future or U1 be automated.

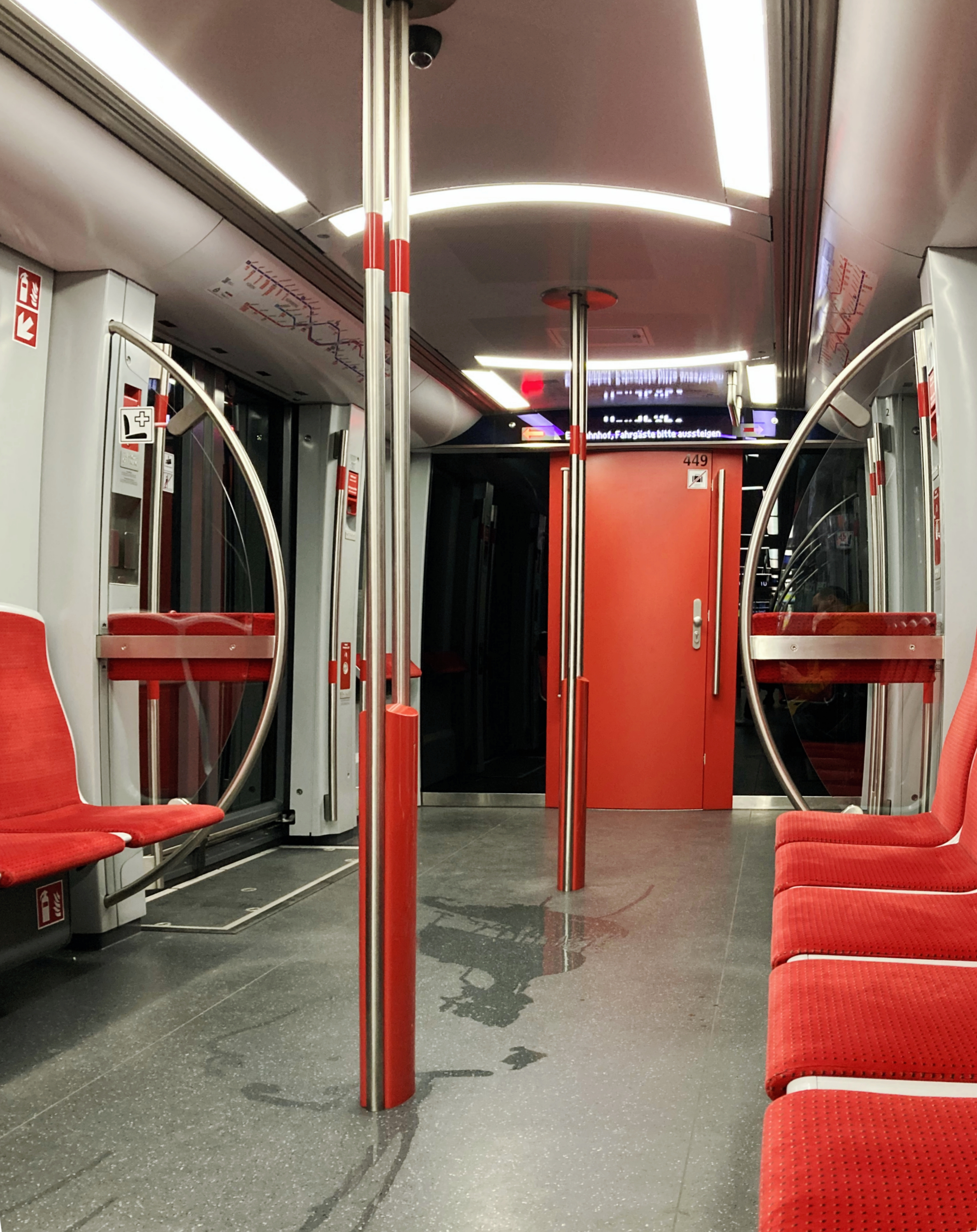
Interior view

== History ==
The trains were ordered in December 2015 as a replacement for the DT1 trains then in service on the U-Bahn system. Construction of the trains began in 2017. The first painted car body was presented at the Siemens Vienna plant on 17 April 2018, and the first set was completed in December 2018. The order also includes options for 11 additional sets, six of which would replace the VAG Class DT2 trains. The option for six additional sets as a replacement for the DT2 trains was exercised on 27 November 2018. Another seven additional sets were ordered in March 2019. The first set was delivered to VAG's Langwasser depot on 3 May 2019. In 2022 the G1 was used on U2 in revenue service, the first time that driver-operated trains ran on that line since its automation in 2010. The last revenue service of DT1 was on 14 January 2023.
