= MVG Class A =

German U-Bahn train type operated in Munich

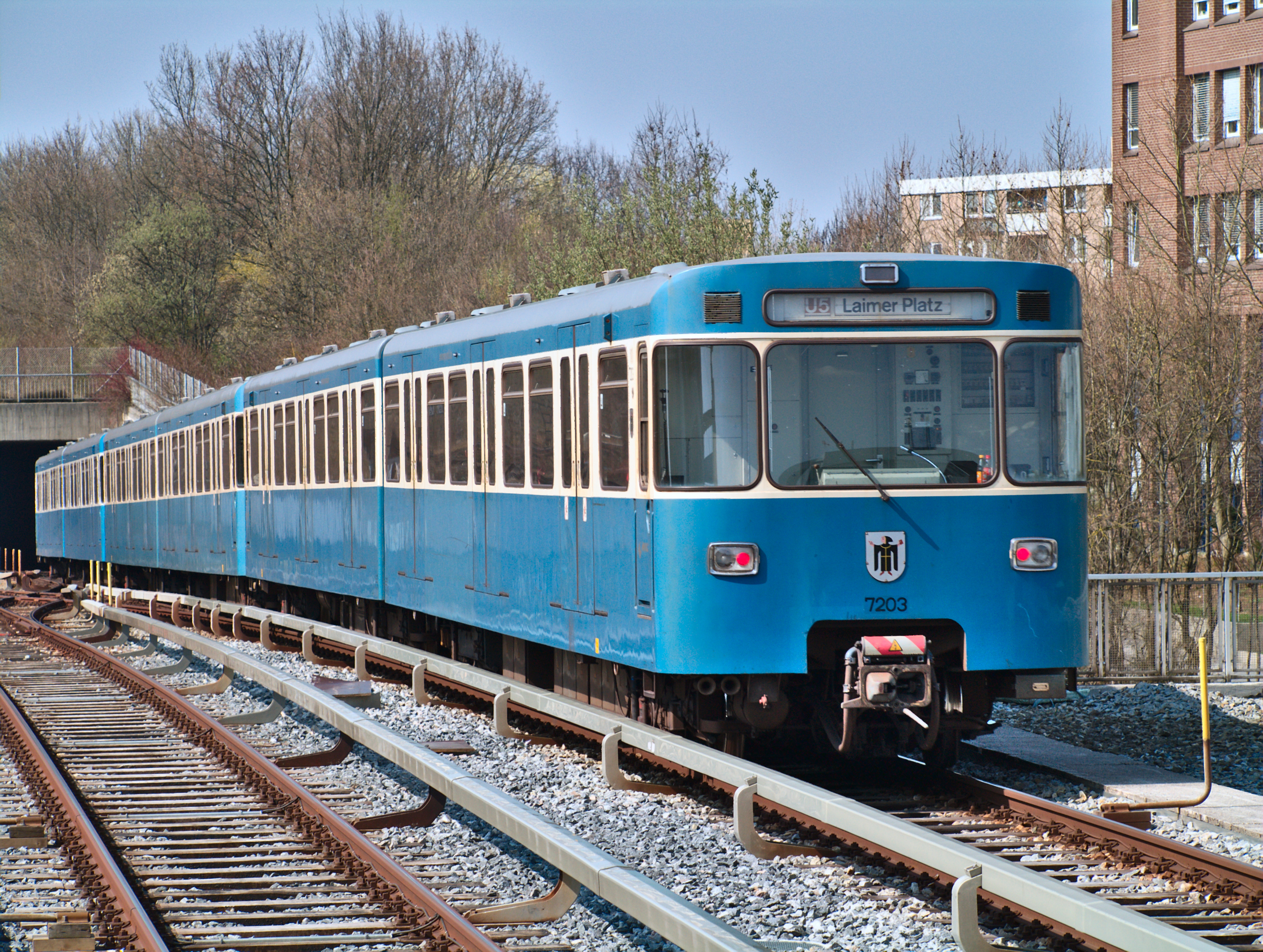
- MVG Class A train leaving Neuperlach Süd station in April 2009
- In service: 1971–present
- Manufacturers: MAN; Orenstein & Koppel; Rathgeber; WMD
- Constructed: 1967–1983
- Number built: 388 vehicles (194 sets)
- Number in service: 36 vehicles (18 sets)
- Number preserved: 3 vehicles
- Formation: 2 cars per trainset
- Fleet numbers: 091–093, 101–151, 161–178, 201–253, 301–348, 351–371
- Capacity: 290 (98 seated, 192 standing)
- Operator: MVG

Specifications
- Car body construction: Aluminium
- Train length: 37.15 m (121 ft 11 in)
- Car length: 18.00 m (59 ft 1 in)
- Width: 2.90 m (9 ft 6 in)
- Height: 3.55 m (11 ft 8 in)
- Doors: 3 pairs per side
- Maximum speed: 80 km/h (50 mph)
- Weight: 51.6 or 53.2 t (50.8 or 52.4 long tons; 56.9 or 58.6 short tons)
- Traction system: Direct current resistor control
- Power output: 720 kW (970 hp)
- Auxiliaries: 110 V Vehicle battery
- Electric systems: 750 V DC third rail
- Current collection: HKO 3400/39 contact shoe
- Braking systems: Electric brake, pneumatic brake, spring accumulator brake
- Safety system: LZB
- Coupling system: Scharfenberg 40-3507/0
- Track gauge: 1,435 mm (4 ft 8 1/2 in)

The MVG Class A is an electric multiple unit (EMU) train type operated by the Münchner Verkehrsgesellschaft on the Munich U-Bahn system. It is the first and oldest type of rolling stock in service on the Munich U-Bahn, and is used on all lines. The prototypes were delivered in 1967, and the full-production units from 1970 until 1983. A derivative of the Class A, the VAG Class DT1, was in service on the Nuremberg U-Bahn system until 2023.

== Formation ==
Every Class A train consists of two permanently-coupled cars, forming a twin-unit. The car at the northern end is numbered 6xxx, while the car at the southern end is numbered 7xxx. The trains are equipped with automatic Scharfenberg couplers, enabling operation of up to three units together to form a six-car train.

The Class A was delivered in six batches:

- A1: prototype units, fleet numbers 091–093, delivered from 1967
- A2.1: full production units, fleet numbers 101–151, delivered from 1970
- A2.2: full production units, fleet numbers 161–178, delivered from 1974
- A2.3: full production units, fleet numbers 201–253, delivered from 1978
- A2.5: full production units, fleet numbers 301–348, delivered from 1982
- A2.6: full production units, fleet numbers 351–371, delivered from 1983

Most units of the A2.1 and A2.2 series were repainted into a livery similar carried by the MVG Class B.

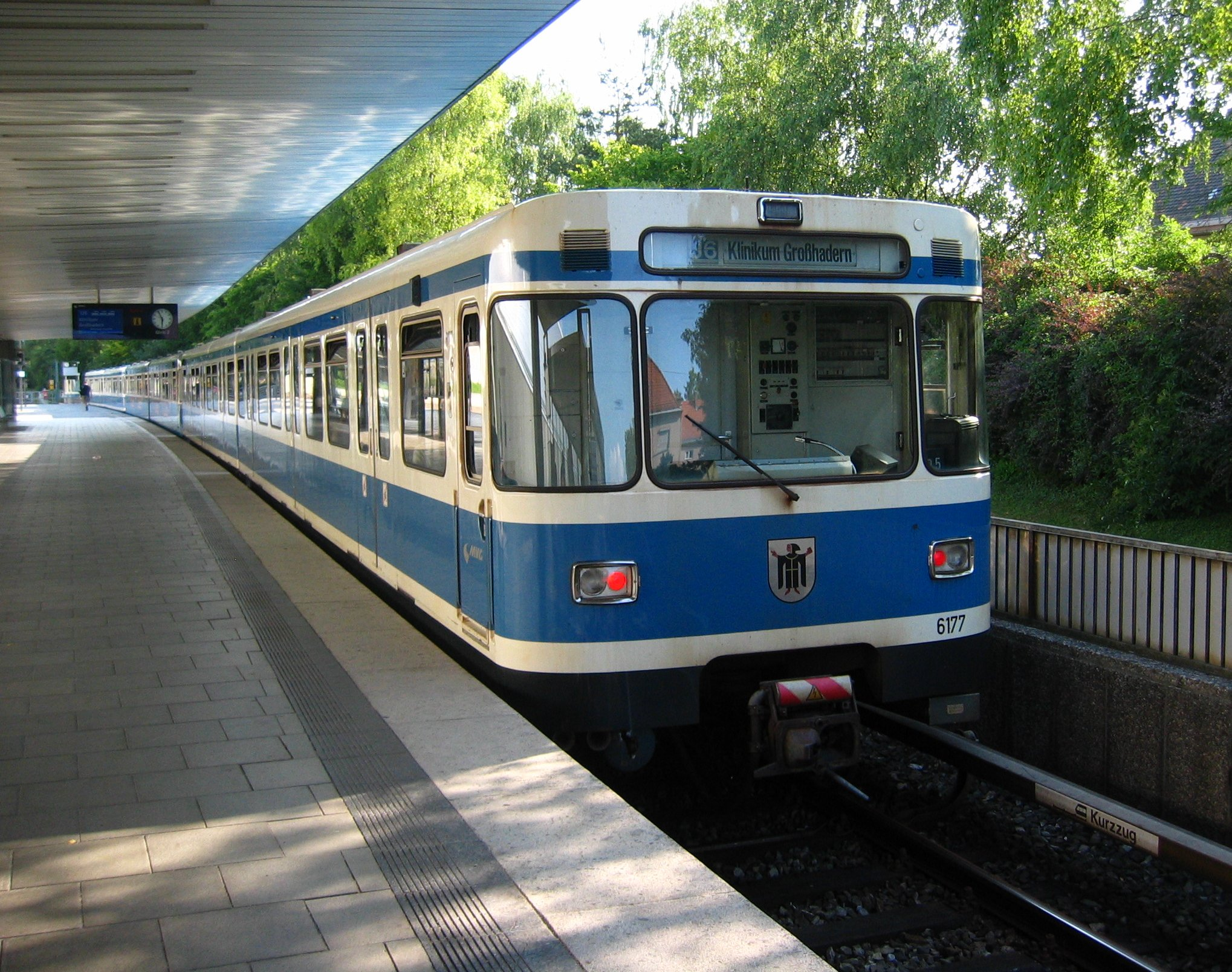
A2.2 series unit in revised livery

=== A1 series ===
Originally numbered 6001–6003, these prototype trains were renumbered to 091–093 from 1970 followed by a general revision of the numbering scheme in 1971.

Car	northern	southern
Designation	A1a	A1b
Numbering	609x	709x
Capacity (total/seated)	145/49	145/49
Weight (t)	51.6	

=== A2 series ===
The first full production A2.1 units were ordered in 1969, with production beginning in 1970. Further units, classified as A2.2–2.6, were built from 1974 until 1983.

Car	northern	southern
Designation	A2a	A2b
Numbering	6xxx	7xxx
Capacity (total/seated)	145/49	145/49
Weight (t)	51.6 (A2.1–2.3); 53.2 (A2.5/2.6)	

== Interior ==
Seating accommodation consists of transverse seating bays in 2+2 configuration, providing seating space for 98 passengers, with additional standing space for 192 passengers per twin unit. The door areas are separated from the seating bays by half-high partition walls reaching slightly over the lower window edge, with panes of glass on top to prevent strong air currents from flowing through the whole passenger compartment. A second handhold pole in the door areas was introduced with the A2.2 series trains. In order to provide more safety and prevent vandalism, the A2.3 trains were delivered with windows at the inner car ends and the doors to the cabs, allowing passengers to look into the adjacent cars. Units of older series, which didn't have those windows, were later retrofitted. Some units also have been retrofitted with video surveillance cameras and LCD passenger information screens.

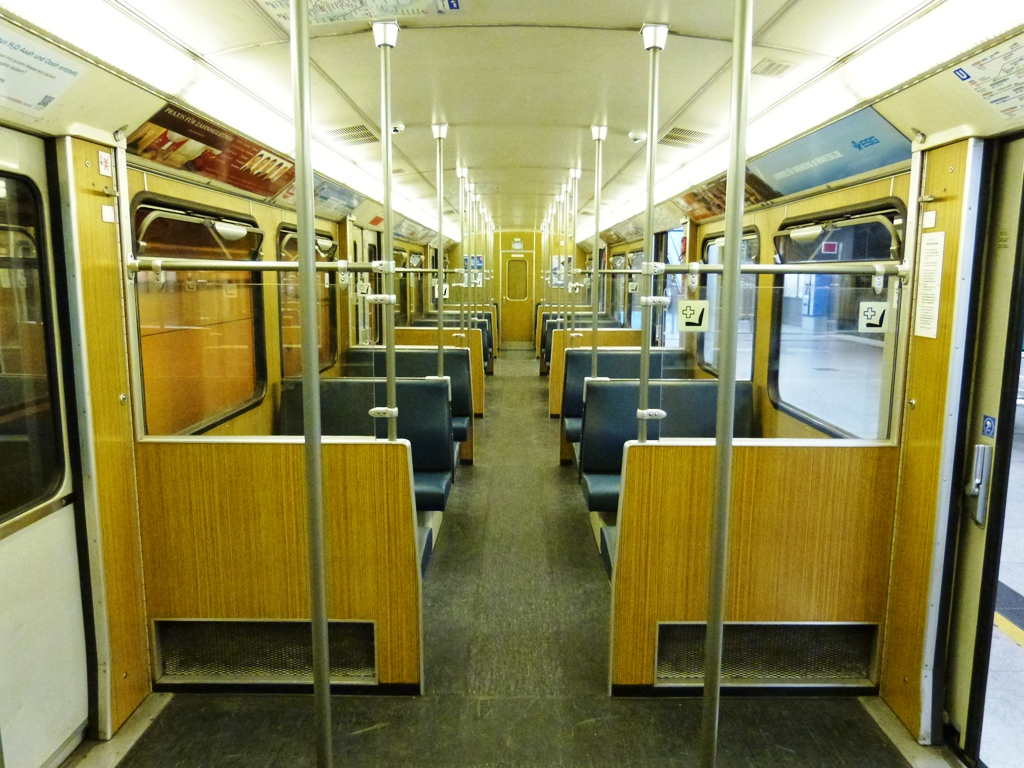
Interior view

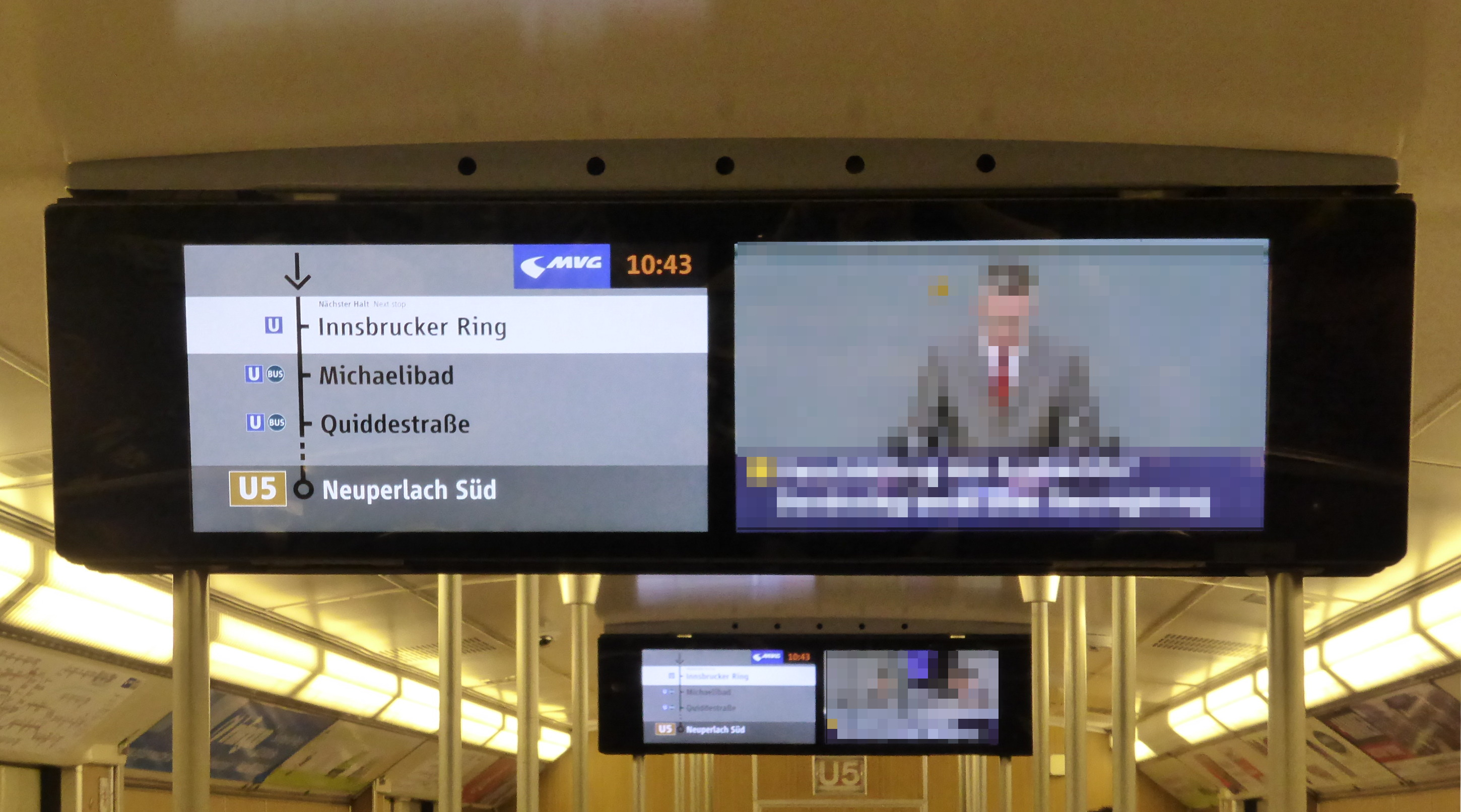
LCD screens inside a Class A train

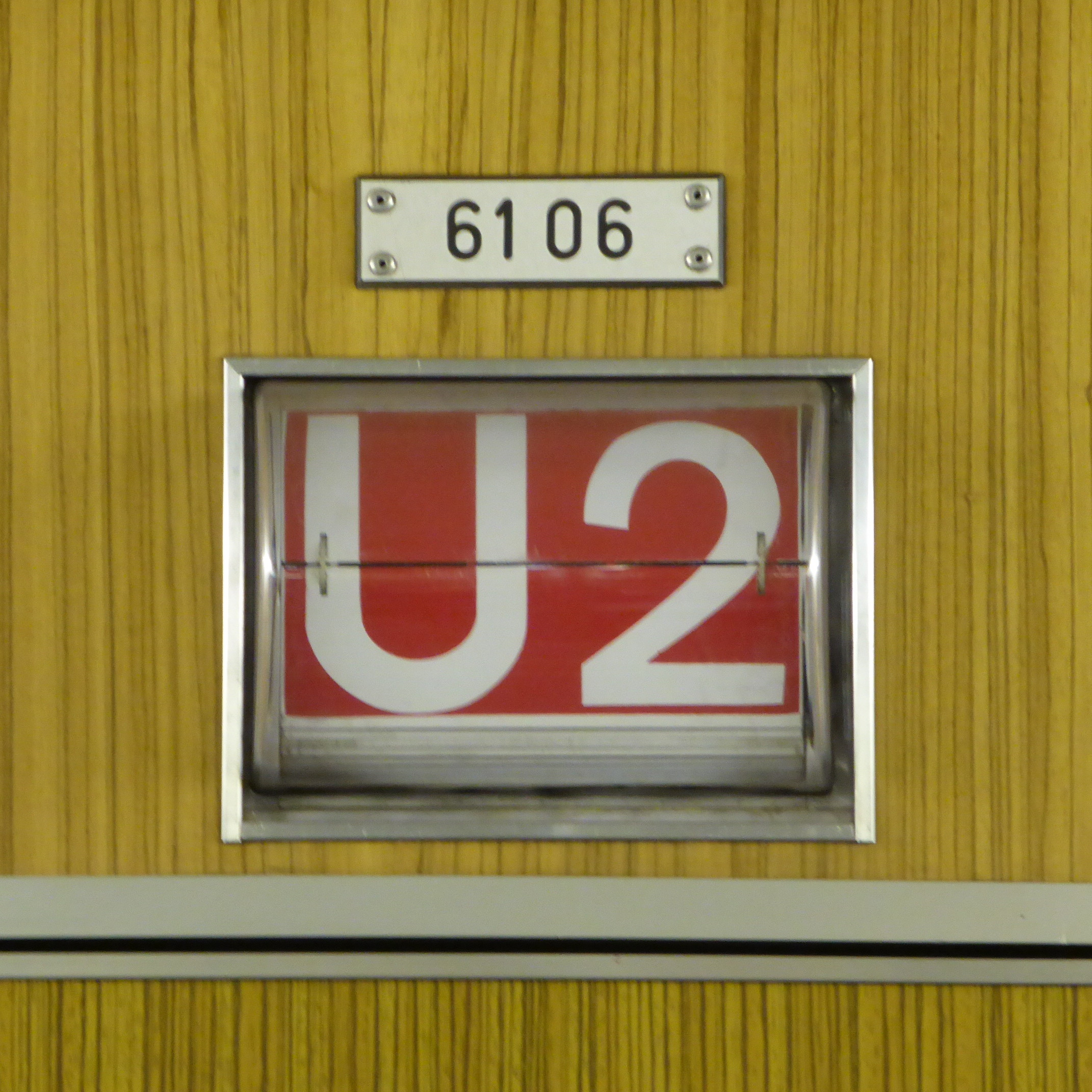
Split-flap line indicator inside a Class A train

== Technical specifications ==
The car bodies are made out of aluminium. While the prototypes are fitted with a rubber pad suspension, the full production trains have an air suspension. The full production units also feature reinforced door columns to better support the roof structure. The number of roof-mounted air intakes was raised from eight to twelve from the A2.2 series trains onwards. Contact shoes are fitted on each side of the outer bogies. As all contact shoes are electrically connected, one train can pass through dead sections of up to 30 m (98 ft 5 in) length without running out of power. The A2.3 series trains introduced a number of improvements, including a newly designed compressed air system and split-flap destination indicators, which were also retrofitted into units of older series, replacing the non-automated destination signs. The Class A trains are powered by resistor-controlled direct-current motors, which are capable of rheostatic braking. Passenger compartments of parked trains can be preheated to up to 15 °C (59 °F) by applying current on the resistors. One twin-unit has four powered bogies with a power output of 180 kW, bringing the total power output to 720 kW.

=== Experimental thyristor-chopper control set ===
In 1974, prototype unit 093 was converted to thyristor-chopper control, and served as a test train. One goal of the conversion, which was supported by the Federal Ministry of Research and Technology, was to evaluate the use of power recovery technology. After about eight years of testing, the train was scheduled to be refitted with its original control equipment at Messerschmitt-Bölkow-Blohm (MBB)s Donauwörth plant. As the experimental control equipment required heavy modifications to the car bodies, MBB couldn't guarantee that the unit would meet the required specifications. Accompanied by the large estimated amount of work and costs, those plans were deemed too uneconomical. Instead, MBB suggested to rebuild the unit with two newly manufactured car bodies. Unit 093 was moved to the Donauwörth plant in July 1982, where all reusable parts were salvaged and built into two new car bodies based on the A2.5 series design. The rebuilt unit was moved back to Munich in 1983, and has been reinstated into service.

== History ==
The Class A formed the initial fleet for the opening of the Munich U-Bahn system in October 1971. The first units entered trial service in 1967 on a stretch of track which is now part of the line U6. Six trains were lent to the Verkehrsaktiengesellschaft Nürnberg (VAG), which had a shortage of rolling stock during the German Evangelical Church Assembly 1978 in Nuremberg. Two units, 149 and 176, were damaged beyond repair in a fire caused by a malfunctioning cooling fan in 1983. One car body of unit 176 was donated to the Forschungs- und Versuchsamt des Internationalen Eisenbahnverbandes (ORE) and was used for fire research in Norway. The remains of the car were scrapped in Åmål, Sweden, in 1985. Two more units, 309 and prototype unit 092, had to be withdrawn after shunting accidents. After more than 40 years in service, the oldest Class A trains are scheduled to be phased out and replaced by newer Class C2 trains. A total of 194 twin-units have been built between 1967 and 1983, of which 155 units are still in service as of 2021.

=== Resale ===
In 2003, six units were sold to the Verkehrsaktiengesellschaft Nürnberg (VAG), which operated them on the Nuremberg U-Bahn system until 2009. The units were renumbered accordingly to the VAG numbering scheme, but retained their Munich blue and white livery.

The former identities of the units and their new numbers were as shown below.

MVG unit	Car No.	VAG car No.
110	6110/7110	561/562
121	6121/7121	563/564
123	6123/7123	565/566
125	6125/7125	567/568
127	6127/7127	569/570
137	6137/7137	571/572

== Preserved examples ==
- Unit 091: Stored at Fröttmaning depot, awaiting further preservation at the MVG Museum in Munich
- Unit 092: Preserved at the Deutsches Museum Verkehrszentrum in Munich (car 6092)
- The cab section of car 7149, which was severely damaged in a fire in 1983, is exhibited at the Münchner Feuerwehrmuseum in Munich
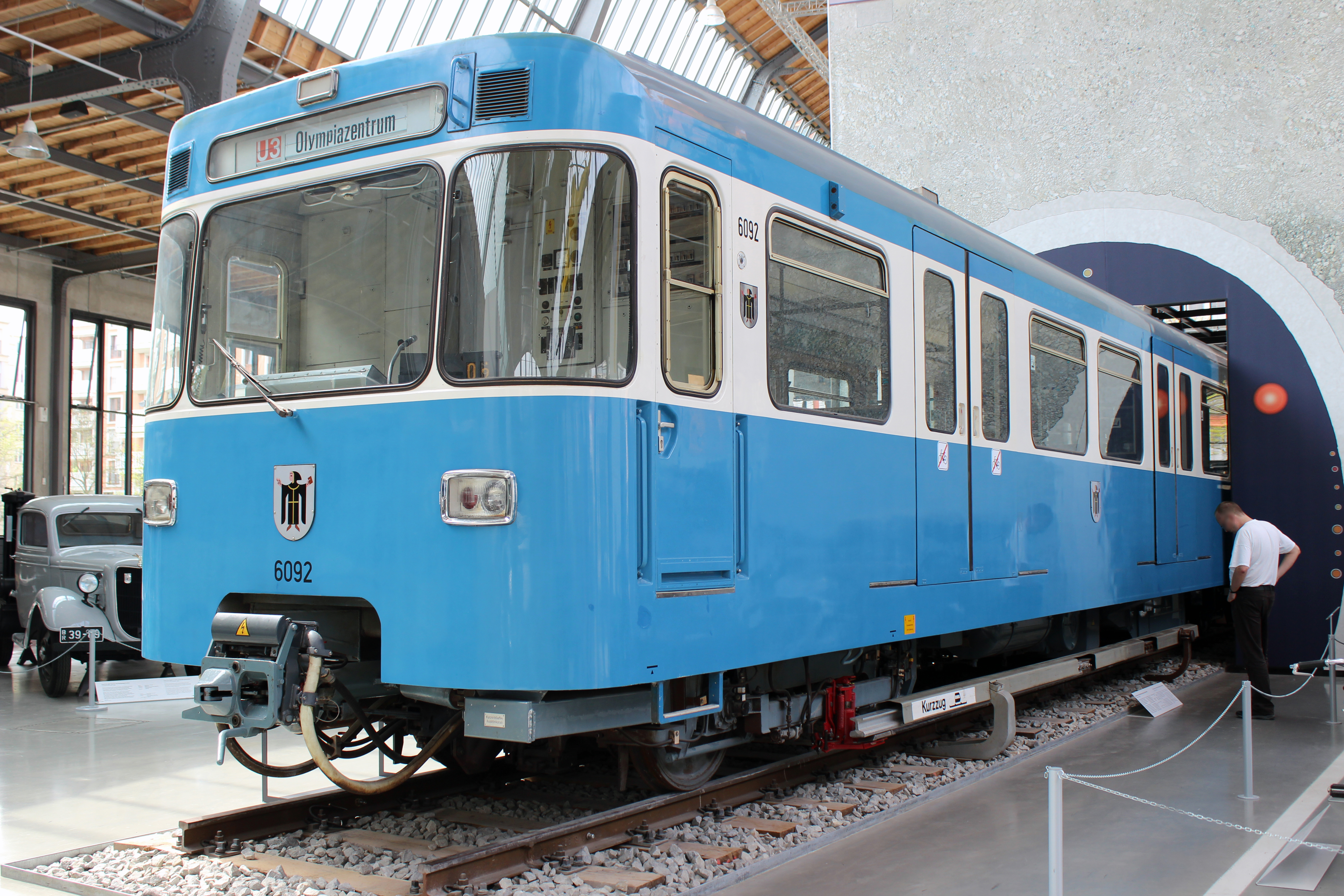
Car 6092 at the Deutsches Museum Verkehrszentrum

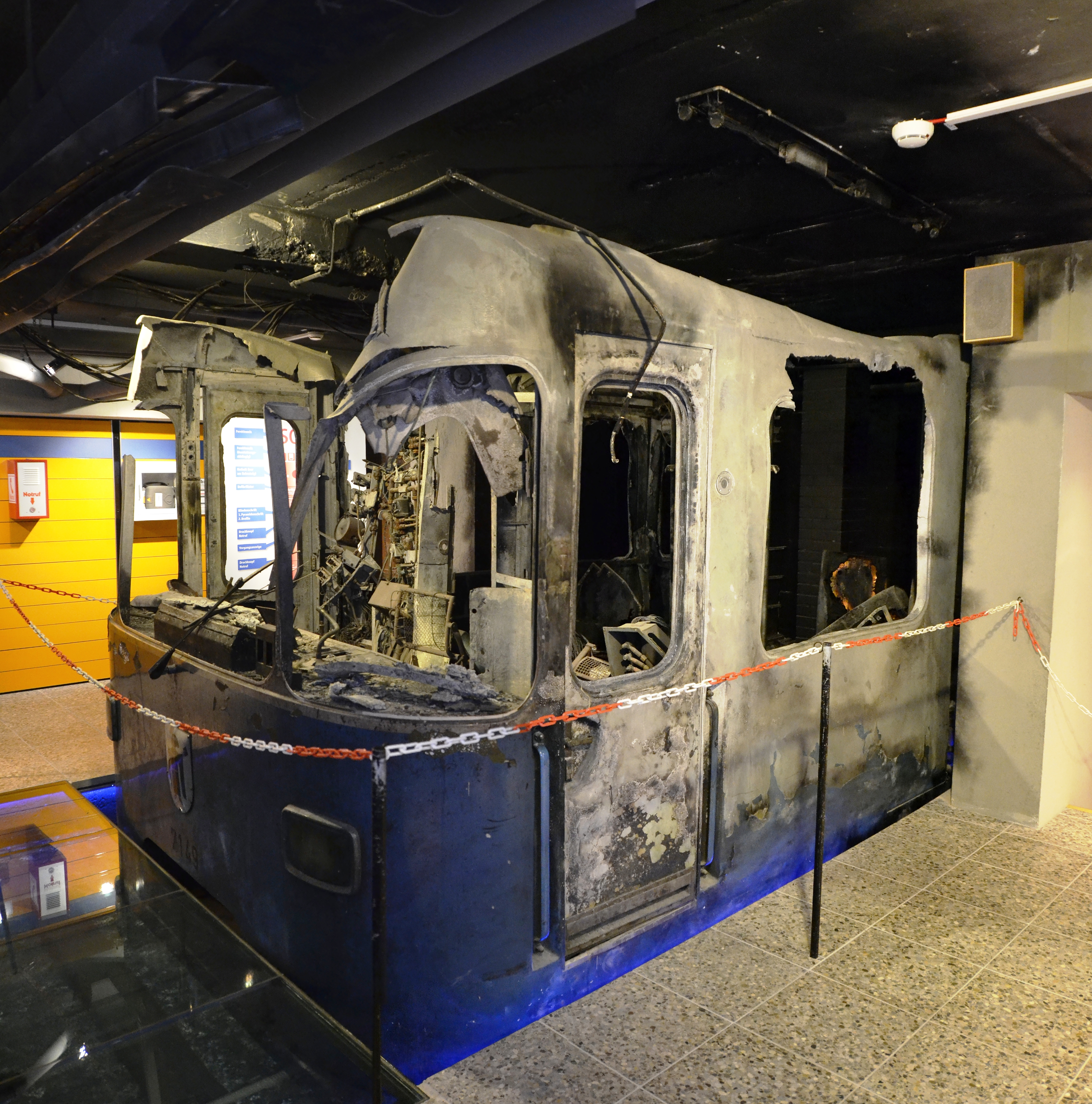
Damaged cab section of car 7149 at the Münchner Feuerwehrmuseum
