= Alexander Neumeister =

German industrial designer from Berlin (born 1941)

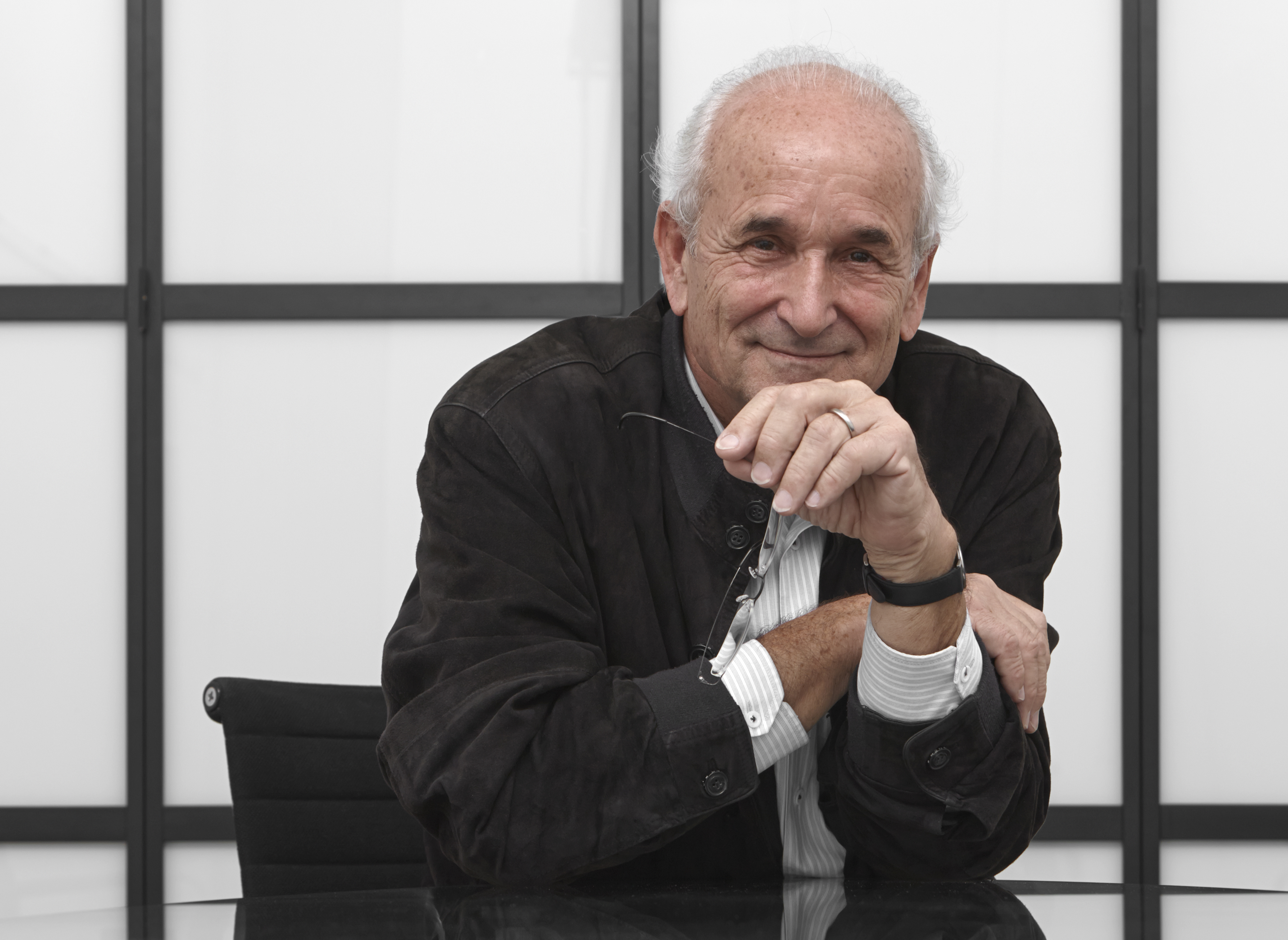
- Alexander Neumeister (2012)
- Born: December 17, 1941 (age 84)
- Occupation: Industrial designer
- Known for: Designs of the ICE and Transrapid, Founder of N+P Industrial Design

Alexander Neumeister (born 17 December 1941) is a German industrial designer from Berlin. He studied at the Ulm School of Design. He gained recognition for his designs of the ICE and Transrapid for which he received the German Design Award. The brand ICE has 100% recognition in Germany. He also designed Japanese Shinkansen trains including the 500 Series Shinkansen, the German DMU "Talent" and the "C-Wagen" of the Munich subway.

In 1970, he founded N+P Industrial Design. He left the company in 2012.
