= Münchner Verkehrsgesellschaft =

Public transport operating company in Germany

- Industry: Public transport
- Founded: 2001
- Headquarters: Munich, Germany
- Area served: Greater Munich

The Münchner Verkehrsgesellschaft (MVG; Munich Transport Company) is a municipally owned company responsible for operating public transport in Munich, Germany. It operates buses, the Munich tramway and the Munich U-Bahn.

The company is a subsidiary of Stadtwerke München (Munich City Utilities), and a member of the Münchner Verkehrs- und Tarifverbund (MVV; Munich Transport and Tariff Association).

== Services ==
=== U-Bahn (Subway) ===
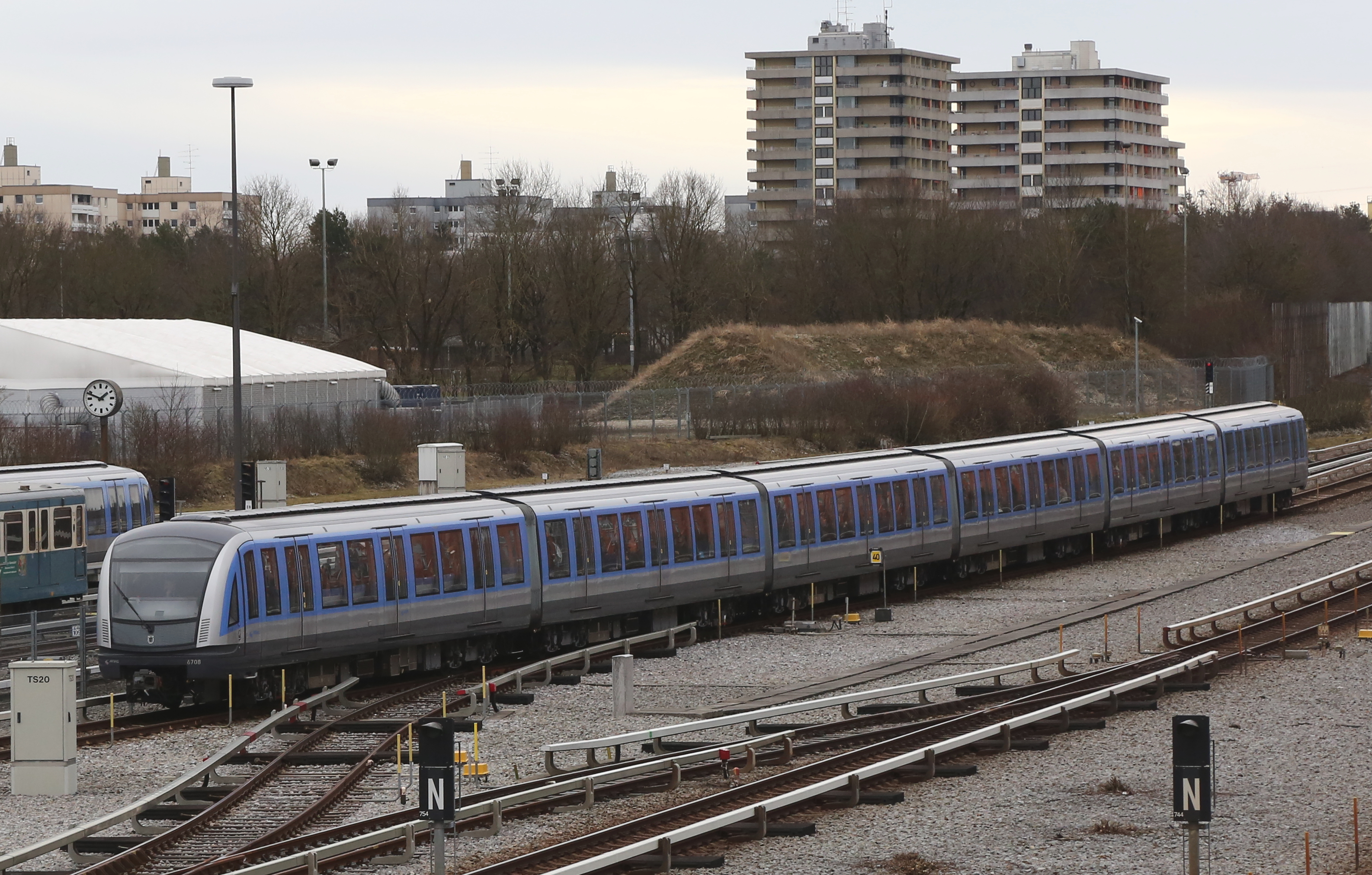
Train car of the MVG Class C

The U-Bahn, alongside the S-Bahn and Regional trains operated by the DB Regio Bayern, is the most important form of public transportation in Munich. In 2022 about 364 million passengers used it, in 2019 before the pandemic it was 615 million. The U-Bahn network has been extended continuously until 2010 with the extension of the U3 to Moosach. Nowadays, multiple new extensions have been planned, some of them are already being constructed.

There are three different generations of U-Bahn trains currently in use, called MVG Class A, MVG Class B and MVG Class C. In total, 768 train cars are being used. At night, the U-Bahn does not operate to allow for repairs and cleaning work.

The MVG subway system is 95 kilometers large, and there are 100 stations including 4 crossing stations, which are counted twice. The U-Bahn lines are named after the letter "U" followed by the number of the line (e.g. U3). Out of the 8 lines in total, 2 are amplifiers only driving at busy hours. All lines are serviced at least every 10 minutes, and connect with at least one other line in the center, thereby forming three main lines (U1/U2/U7/U8, U3/U6 and U4/U5).

Excluding a section in Garching, the U-Bahn only rides within Munich downtown.

=== Tramway ===
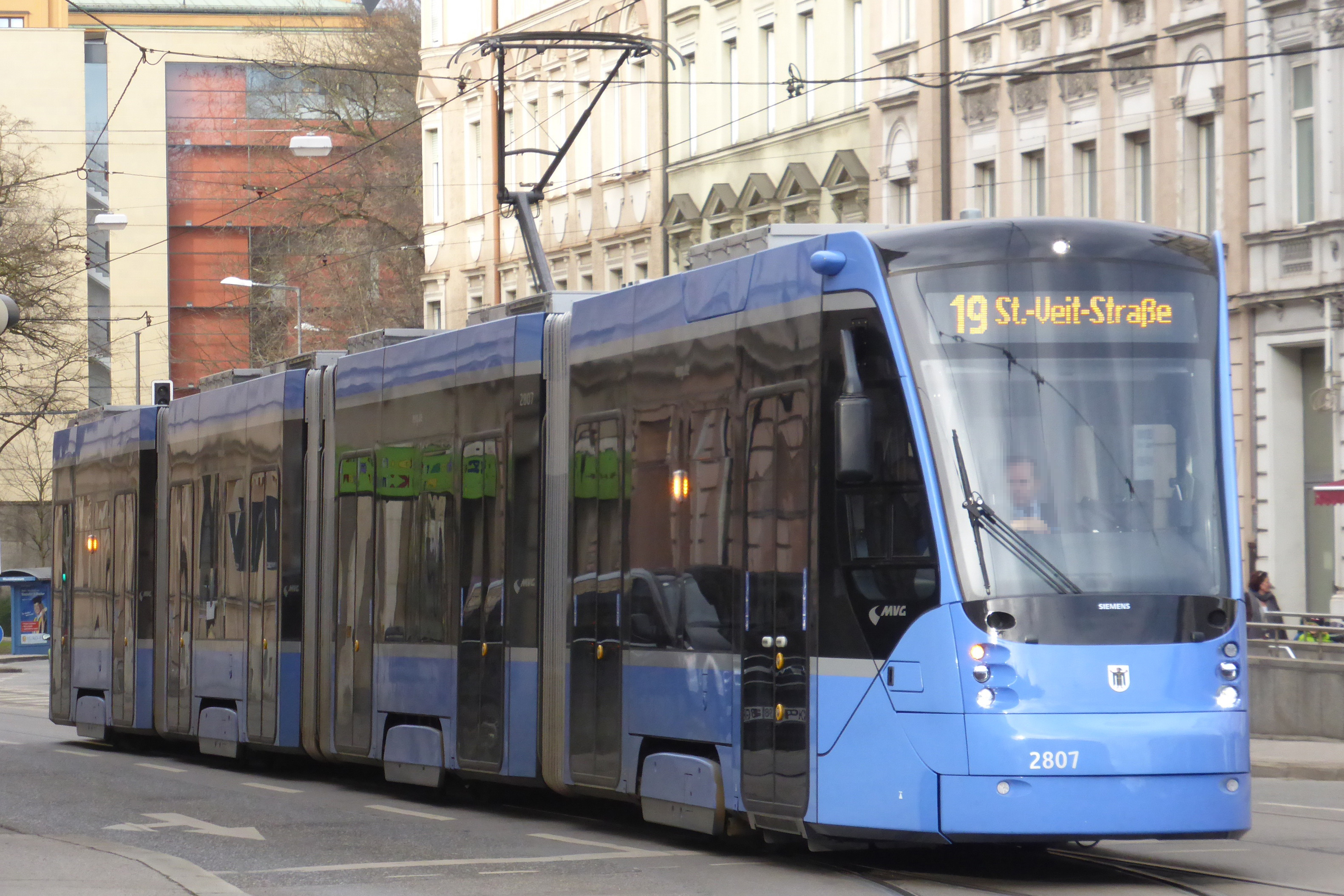
Vehicle of the Type T1.6

The MVG tramway is 82 kilometers big, of which 58 kilometers are on a separate tram-only route. In 2019 about 69 Million Passengers used it. Currently, the MVG possesses 132 low-floor streetcars.

Since 2018, there are nine lines driving throughout the day, as well as 4 amplifier lines and four nightlines, which just like the night busses have the letter "N" right before the line number. On the entire network, the trams ride at least every 10 minutes until 10 PM.

By law, the trams have priority over cars and busses, which allows them to work faster and better meet their timeliness requirements. Outside of one section in Grünwald, the tram only rides within Munich downtown.

== MVG Museum ==
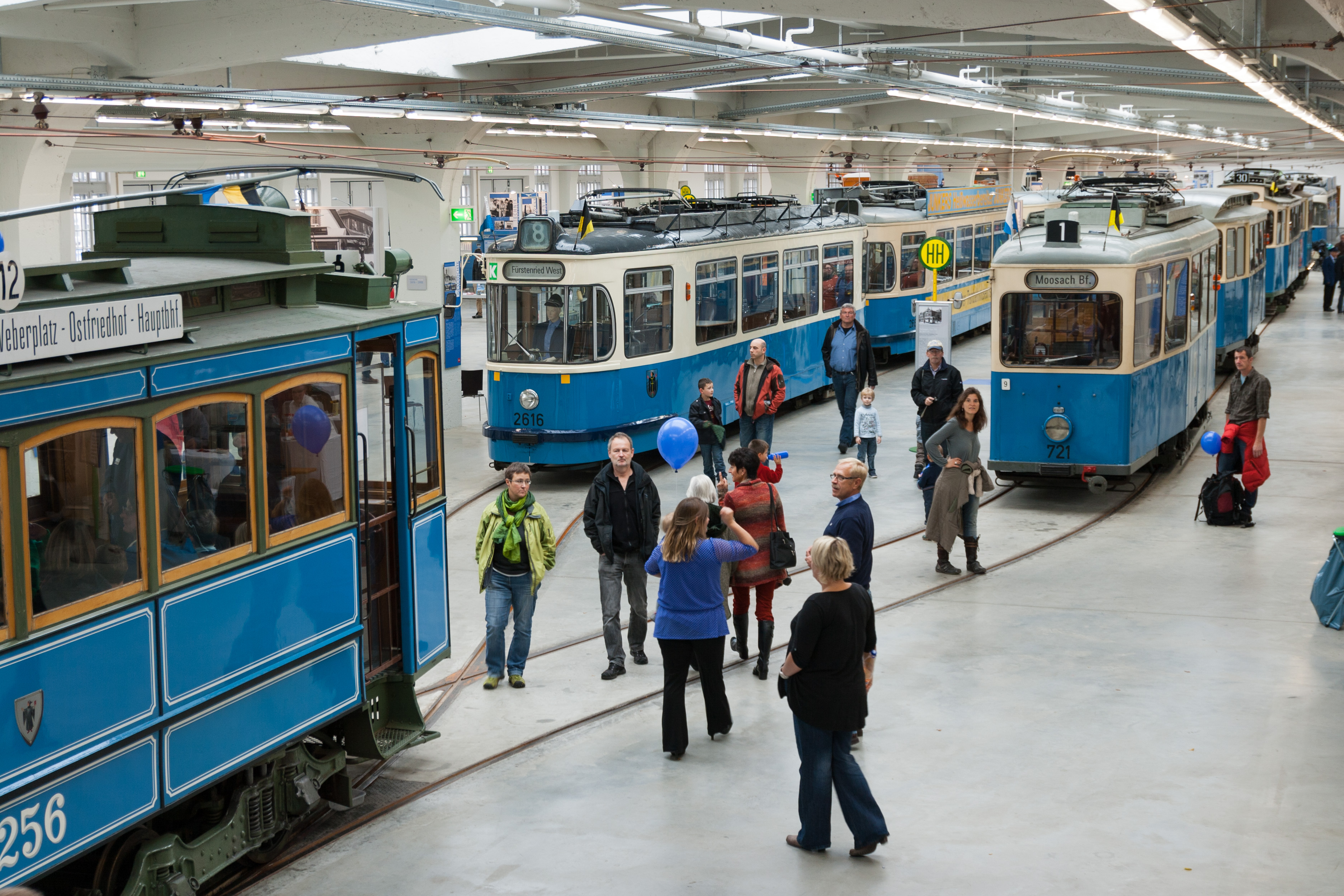
MVG Museum

The MVG maintains a museum, located at Ständlerstraße 20 near the terminus of tram line 18. The museum contains a collection of some 25 historic trams, buses and utility vehicles from different eras. It opens to the public on alternate Sundays.
