= MVG Class C =

German U-Bahn train type operated in Munich

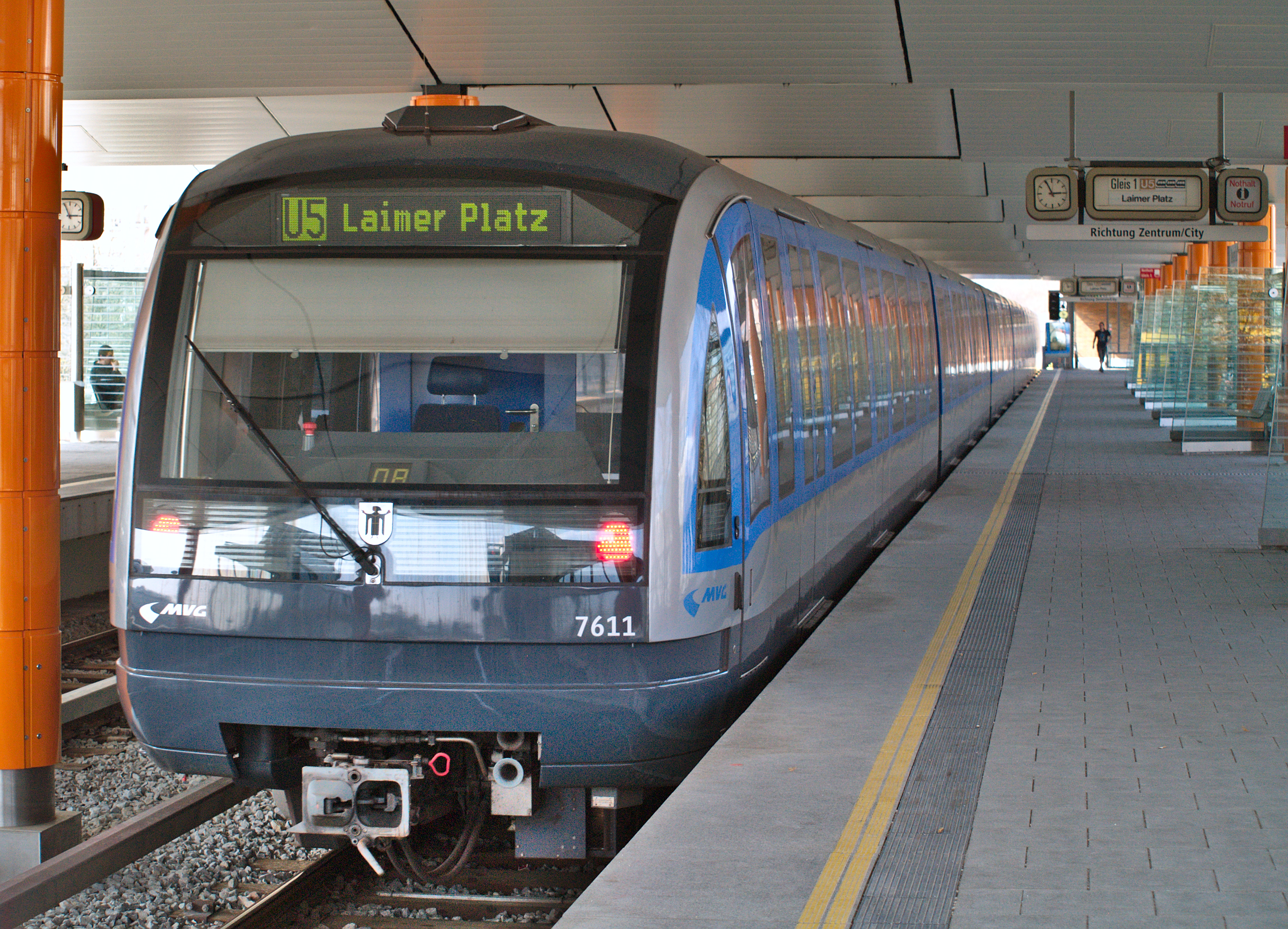
- MVG Class C train at Neuperlach Süd station in April 2009
- In service: 2002–present
- Manufacturers: Adtranz/Bombardier (C1 only), Siemens
- Designer: Alexander Neumeister
- Family name: C2: Inspiro
- Replaced: MVG Class A
- Constructed: 2000–2026
- Number built: C1: 108 vehicles (18 sets); C2: 510 vehicles (85 sets)
- Number in service: C1: 102 vehicles (17 sets); C2: 510 vehicles (85 sets)
- Number scrapped: C1: 6 vehicles (1 set)
- Formation: 6 cars per trainset
- Fleet numbers: 601–618, 701–785
- Capacity: C1: 912 (252 seated); C2: 940 (220 seated)
- Operator: MVG

Specifications
- Car body construction: Welded aluminium
- Train length: 115 m (377 ft 4 in)
- Car length: 19.78 m (64 ft 11 in) (end cars); 18.82 m (61 ft 9 in) (intermediate cars)
- Width: 2.9 m (9 ft 6 in)
- Height: 3.55 m (11 ft 8 in)
- Doors: 3 pairs per side
- Maximum speed: 80 km/h (50 mph)
- Weight: 164 t (C1), 180 t (C2)
- Traction system: Siemens IGBT–VVVF (C2: SIBAC G750 D570/600 M5-1)
- Traction motors: C1: 24 × Siemens 1TB1914 (100 kW (134 hp)); C2: 24 × Siemens 1TB2006 (140 kW (188 hp))
- Power output: C1: 2.4 MW (3,218 hp); C2: 3.36 MW (4,506 hp)
- Electric systems: 750 V DC third rail
- Current collection: Contact shoe
- UIC classification: Bo′Bo′+Bo′Bo′+Bo′Bo′+Bo′Bo′+Bo′Bo′+Bo′Bo′
- Braking systems: Electric brake, pneumatic brake, spring accumulator brake
- Safety system: LZB
- Coupling system: Scharfenberg (non-electrical)
- Track gauge: 1,435 mm (4 ft 8 1/2 in) standard gauge

The MVG Class C is an electric multiple unit (EMU) train type operated by the Münchner Verkehrsgesellschaft on the Munich U-Bahn system since 2002. It is the first type of rolling stock on the Munich U-Bahn that consists of more than two cars and features gangways between the individual cars.

== Design ==
The first concept intended a three car train. Those plans were later revised to a six car formation, with the exterior and interior designed by Alexander Neumeister. The newer C2 trains are based on the C1, and are also designed by Neumeister. For its design, the C2 trains were awarded a German Design Award, Red Dot Design Award for product design 2013, and Universal Design Consumer Favorite award 2013.

== Formation ==
Every Class C train consists of six cars, which are connected by gangways allowing passengers to walk through the whole train. While the shortest technically possible formation consists of two end cars and one intermediate car, every train in service has been running in a six car formation. Their length of 114 m (374 ft 0 in) (Note: According to Pischek & Junghardt, the trains have a length of 115,000 mm (377 ft 4 in).) makes them the longest metro subway trains in Germany.

The Class C was delivered in several batches:

- C1.9: fleet numbers 601–610, delivered from 2001
- C1.10: fleet numbers 611–618, delivered from 2005
- C2.11: fleet numbers 701–721, delivered from 2013
- C2.12: fleet numbers 722–745, delivered from 2019
- C2.13: 22 further trains (third delivery series), with the first delivered on 27 April 2022
- C2.13: 18 further trains ordered on 27 April 2022 following a Europe-wide tender, to be manufactured at the Siemens Mobility plant in Vienna and delivered in 2024–2025, bringing the planned total C2 fleet to 85 six-car trainsets

=== C1 series ===
Car	Mc1	M1	M2	M3	M4	Mc2
Numbering (sets 601–609)	66xx	86xx	865x	875x	87xx	76xx
Numbering (sets 610–618)	66xx	86xx	866x	876x	87xx	76xx
Capacity (seated)	38	44	44	44	44	38

- Car Mc1 is at the northern end, while car Mc2 is at the southern end.

== Interior ==
Seating accommodation consists of longitudinal seating in the end cars and transverse seating bays in the intermediate cars with longitudinal seats near the gangways to the adjacent cars. Only the transverse seats are upholstered; the longitudinal seats are made out of wood. LED panels display the station names, accompanied by automated announcements. The C1 trains have a total capacity of 912 passengers, with 252 seated and 660 standing. The C2.11 trains feature LED interior lighting, LCD passenger information screens, CCTV security cameras and upholstery on all seats. LED stripes on the door edges of the C2 trains show passengers when the doors can be opened and when they are closing. The C2 trains have a total capacity of 940 passengers, with 220 seated and 720 standing. The ceiling-mounted handrails were criticized as being too high, thus only being accessible by tall passengers.

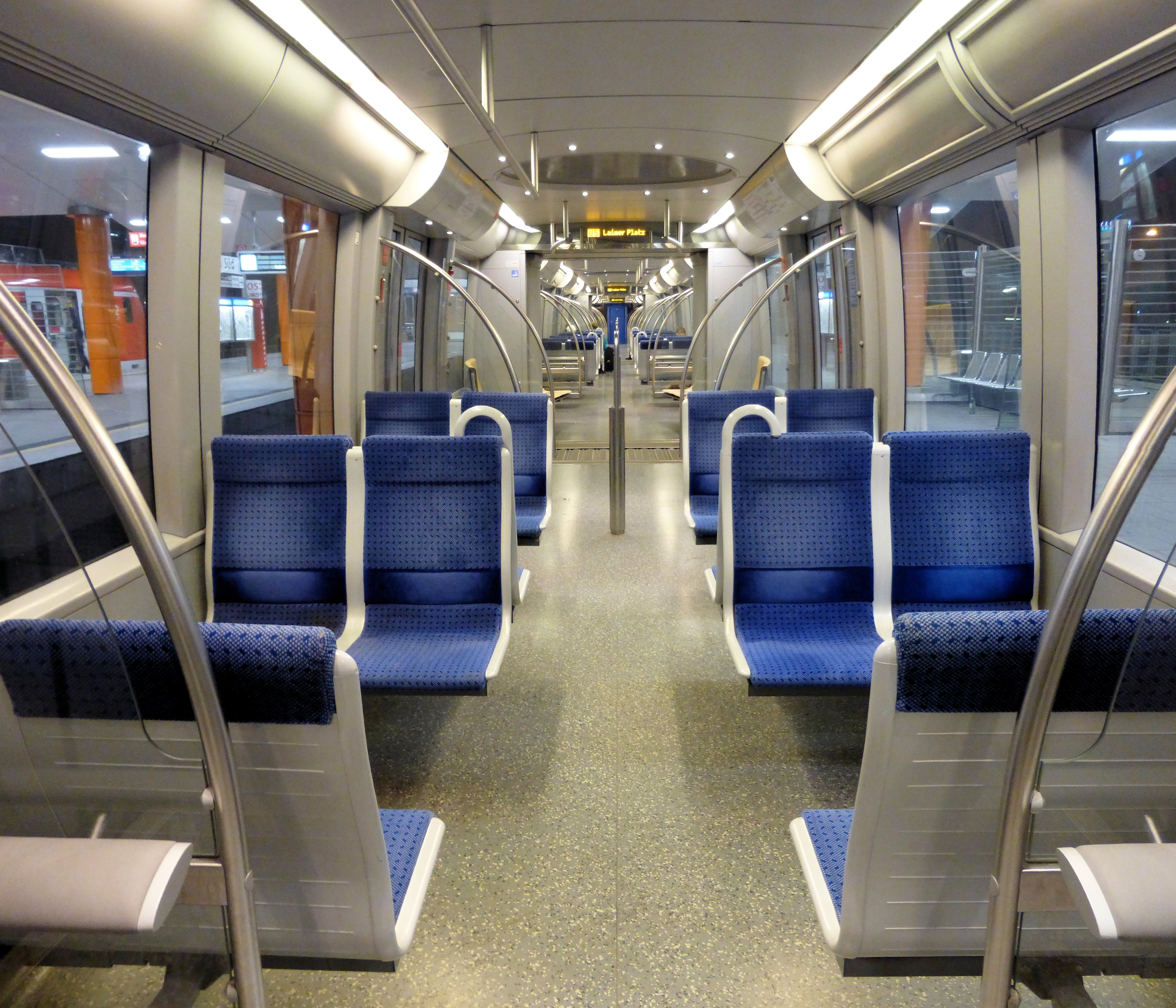
Transverse seating bays in the intermediate cars

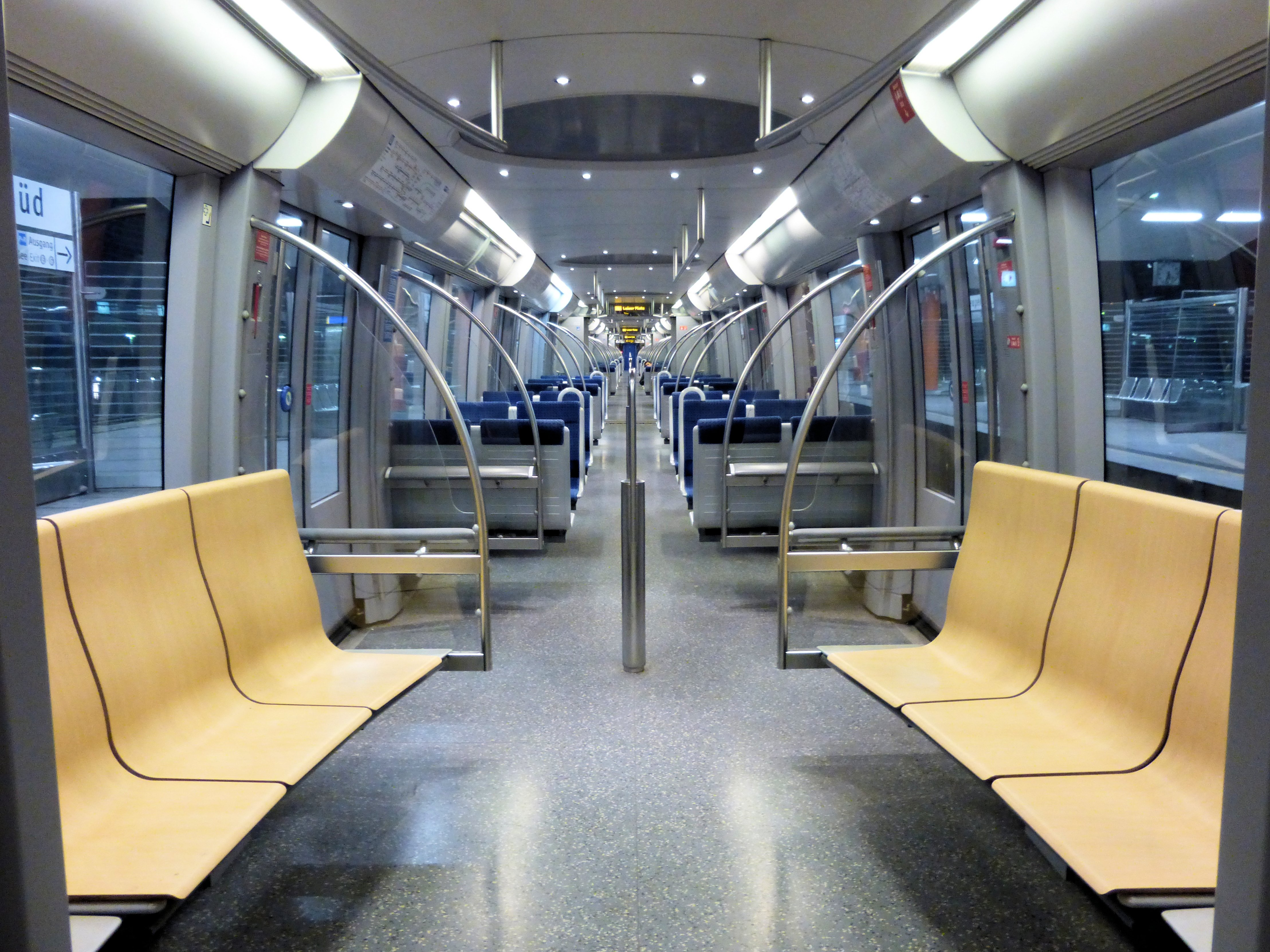
Longitudinal seating at the gangways

== Technical specifications ==
The C1 trains were manufactured jointly by Siemens and Adtranz (later Bombardier Transportation), with Siemens building the electrical parts and Adtranz/Bombardier being responsible for the car bodies, bogies, brakes and lighting equipment. The car bodies are made out of aluminium, and the trains are powered by IGBT-controlled three-phase motors. Every axle is powered by one 100 kW (134 hp) motor, bringing the total power output of one C1 train to 2,400 kW (3,218 hp). The C2 trains were manufactured completely by Siemens, and have a power output of 3,360 kW (4,506 hp) with a maximum speed of 80 km/h (50 mph) in passenger service, although their maximum design speed is 90 km/h (56 mph).

== History ==
The first trains, classified as C1.9, were ordered in 1997, with deliveries beginning in 2001. Weak spots on the couplers were discovered during test runs, leading to the trains not being approved by the authorities. The already delivered sets were moved back to Adtranz/Bombardier's Berlin plant for modifications. The first trains entered service in 2002. Eight additional sets, classified as C1.10, were delivered in 2005. Another 21 sets, classified as C2.11, were ordered in 2010 with an option of 46 more. The first of the 22 trains from the second option (C2.13 series) was delivered on 27 April 2022, the same day on which SWM commissioned an additional 18 C2 trains from Siemens Mobility following a Europe-wide tender, bringing the total planned C2 fleet to 85 trainsets. These additional trains are to be manufactured at the Siemens Mobility plant in Vienna and delivered in 2024–2025. Worth 185 million Euro, it is the biggest rolling stock order in the history of the Munich U-Bahn. The first painted bodyshell was unveiled at the Siemens plant in Vienna on 5 October 2012. Originally intended to enter passenger service in 2013, the Technical Authority of Oberbayern didn't gave their permission due to faulty doors and problems regarding the loading gauge. The first C2 trains entered passenger service on 17 June 2016, between Kieferngarten and Garching-Forschungszentrum stations on line U6. The C2 trains then operated on the whole line U6 with a temporary permission, which was due to expire on 30 April 2018. On 14 June 2018, the permission was expanded to line U3, with set 716 being the first C2 train entering passenger service on line U3 on the same day. The last of the 21 C2.11 sets was delivered on 9 November 2018. The first of a further batch of 24 C2 sets arrived in Munich in June 2019. Entry into service is planned for 2020, and deliveries of these sets are scheduled to be finished in 2022. The first C2.12 series trains received their running permission from the Technical Authority of Oberbayern on 5 May 2020. C2 trains entered service on line U1 on 18 August 2021, and on the U4/U5 on 16 September 2022. C2 trains entered service on line U2 on 7 October 2020, between Feldmoching and Messestadt Ost. The last C2 train built entered service in July 2026.

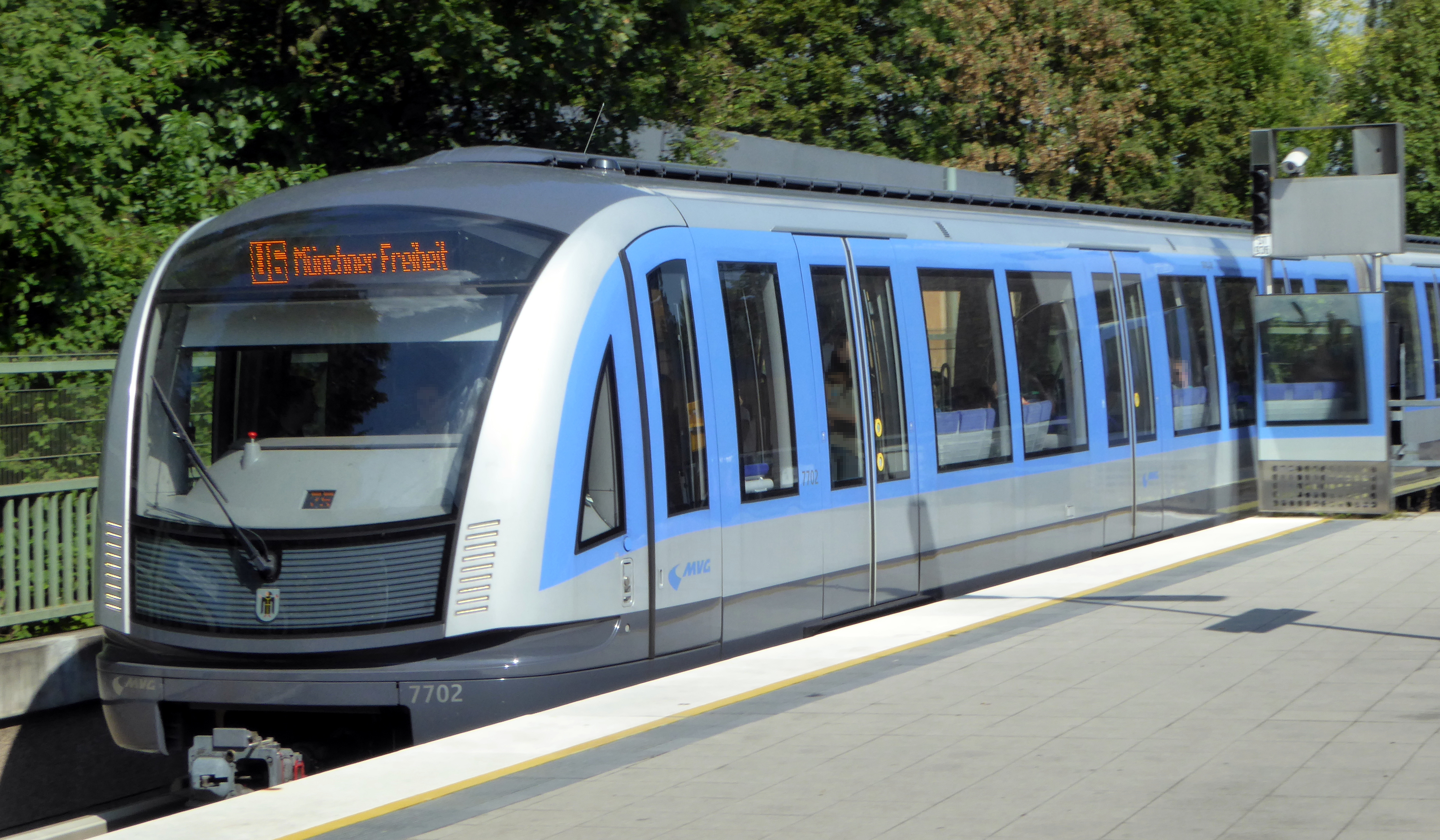
A C2.11 train at Studentenstadt station in September 2016

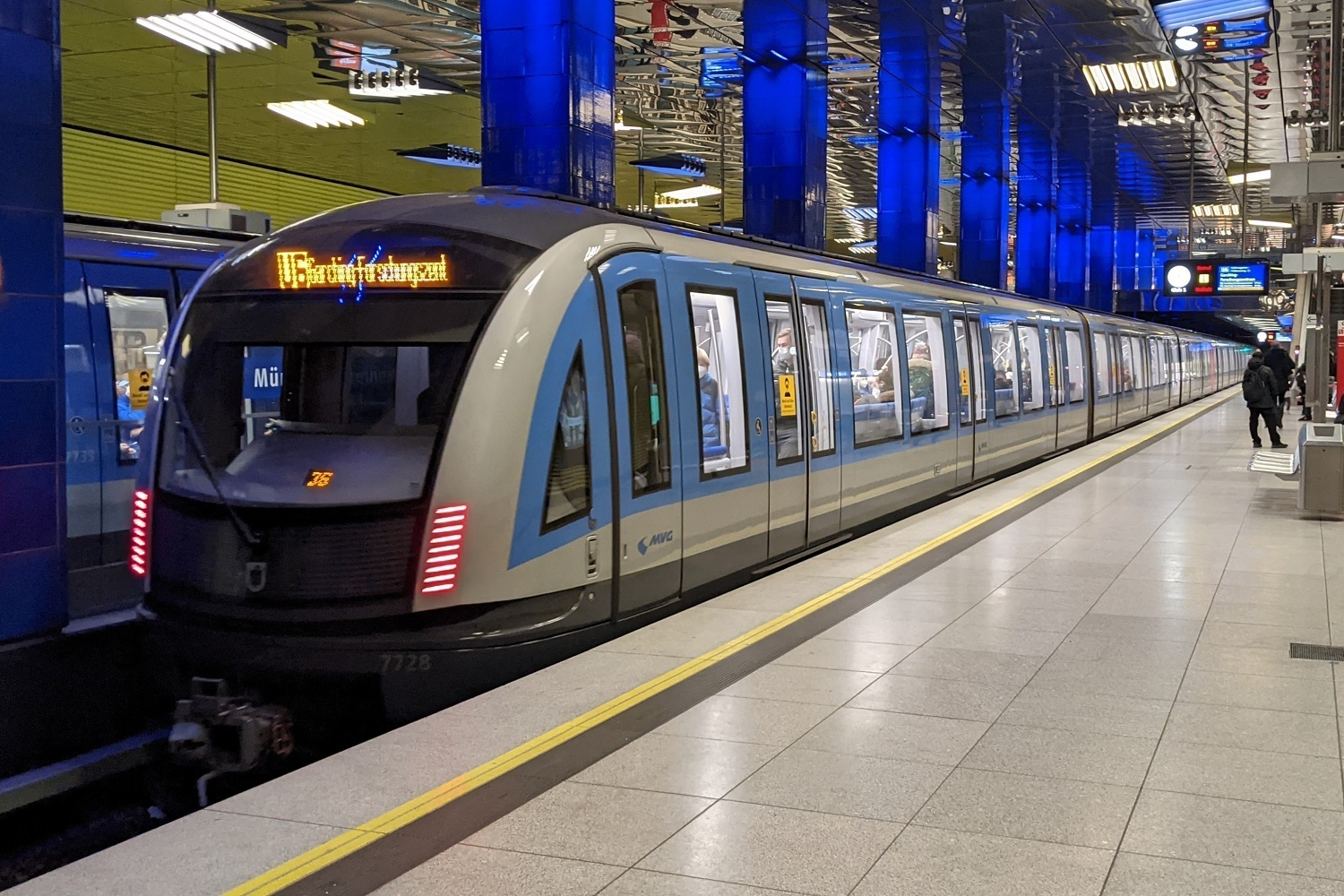
C2.12 set 728 at Münchner Freiheit station in November 2021

== Incidents and accidents ==
- On 7 May 2015, C1 set 618 ran into a buffer stop on a siding track at Feldmoching station, due to human error. The train was not in revenue service and carried no passengers, only the driver was on board, who suffered a shock. Structural damages on the car frames of the end car and the adjacent intermediate car resulted in set 618 being permanently removed from regular service to undergo repairs, but then it was scrapped.
- On 28 September 2015, one C1 train broke down south of Holzapfelkreuth station. Another train was used to push the defective C1 train to a siding track at Klinikum Großhadern station. While passing through Großhadern station, the coupling between two cars broke, resulting in the gangway being ripped apart. The cause was found to be insufficient assembly of screws during maintenance by an external company. Six trains had to be temporarily withdrawn and inspected following this incident.
- In September 2017, all C2 trains in service were temporarily withdrawn after electric flash-overs happened at the contact shoes.
