= VAG Class DT1 =

German U-Bahn train type operated in Nuremberg

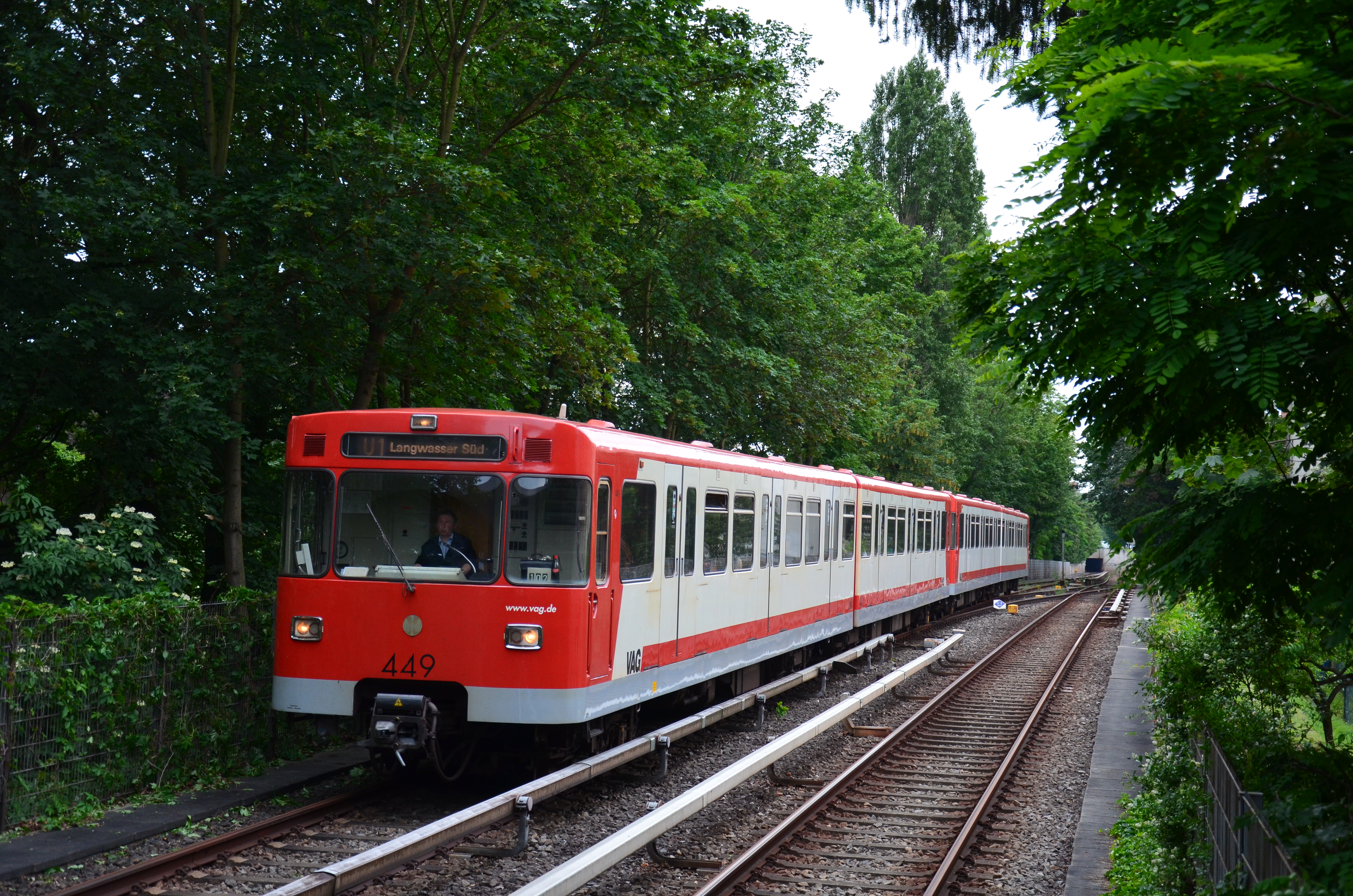
- A DT1 train in service on line U1 in June 2016
- Manufacturer: MAN
- Constructed: 1970–1984
- Scrapped: 2010-2023
- Number built: 128 vehicles (64 sets)
- Number scrapped: 24 vehicles (12 sets)
- Successor: G1
- Formation: 2 cars per trainset
- Fleet numbers: 401/402–527/528
- Capacity: 290 (98 seated)
- Operator: VAG

Specifications
- Car body construction: Aluminium
- Train length: 36,550 mm (119 ft 11 in)
- Width: 2,900 mm (9 ft 6 in)
- Height: 3,550 mm (11 ft 8 in)
- Doors: 3 pairs per side
- Maximum speed: 80 km/h (50 mph)
- Weight: 51.7 t
- Traction system: Direct current resistor control (1970-1980), three-phase chopper control (1980-1984)
- Power output: 720 kW (DC drive version); 800 kW (Three-phase version)
- Electric system: 750 V DC Third rail
- Current collection: contact shoe pantograph (maintenance only)
- Braking systems: Electric brake, pneumatic brake, spring accumulator brake, magnetic track brake
- Track gauge: 1,435 mm (4 ft 8 1/2 in)

The VAG Class DT1 (colloquially called "Pegnitzpfeil") is an electric multiple unit (EMU) train type operated by the Verkehrs-Aktiengesellschaft Nürnberg on the Nuremberg U-Bahn system from its opening in 1972 until 2023. It is a derivative of the MVG Class A, in service on the Munich U-Bahn since 1971.

== Formation ==
Every DT1 train consists of two permanently-coupled cars, forming a twin-unit. The trains are equipped with automatic couplers, enabling operation of up to two units together to form a four-car train.

Numbering	xxx	xxx+1
Capacity (total/seated)	145/49	145/49
Weight (t)	51,7	

== Interior ==
Seating accommodation consists of transverse seating bays. Passengers can look into the adjacent car through two windows in the inner car end.

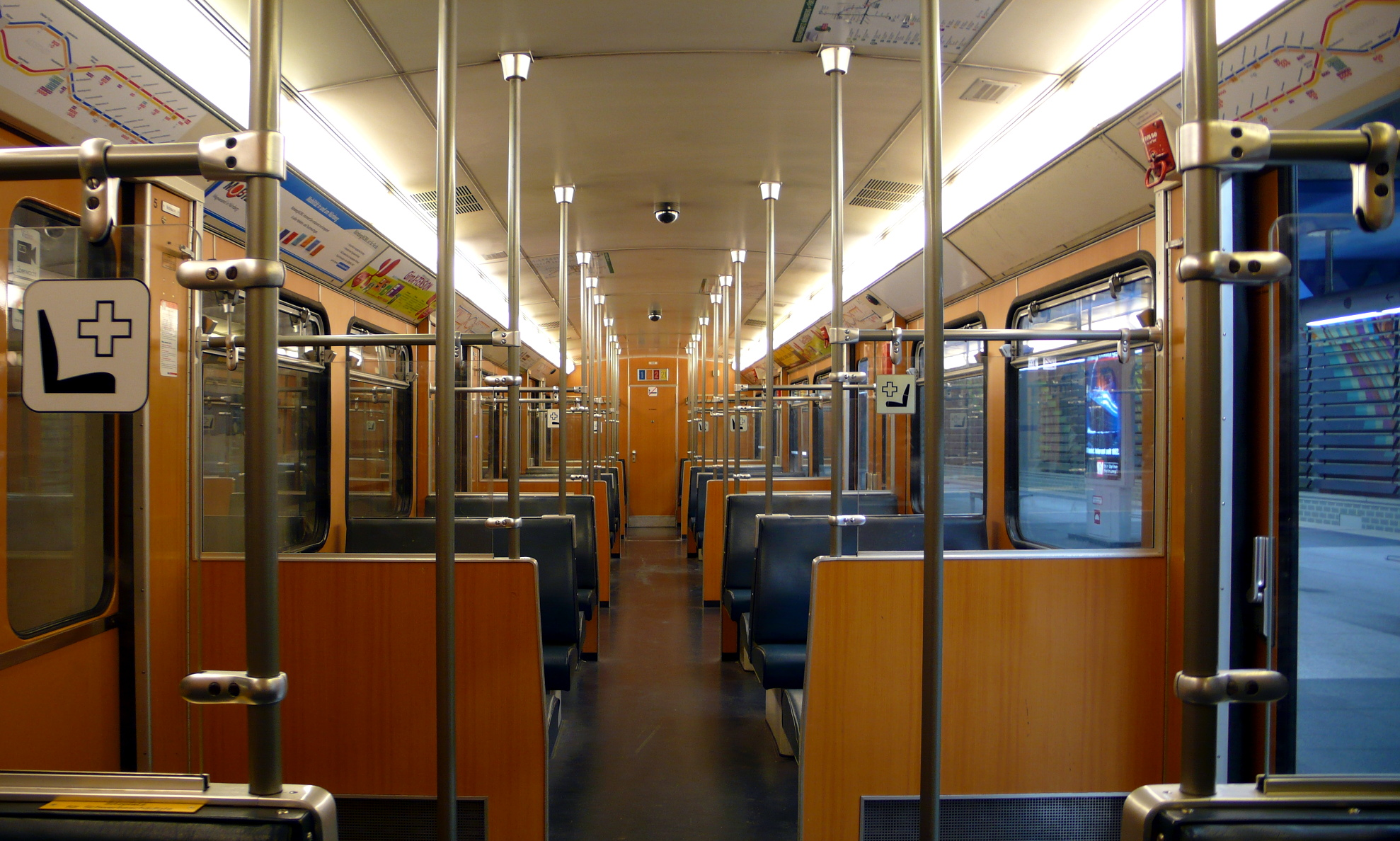
Interior view

== Technical specifications ==
The design is derived from the MVG Class A. Differences include a magnetic track brake system, that is missing from Munich's Class A trains. The car bodies are made out of aluminium, and the trains are powered by direct current motors. Beginning with units 465/466, built from 1980 until the end of production in 1984, the trains were delivered with three-phase motors. Besides the power supply by contact shoes, every unit is also equipped with a pantograph, as parts of the maintenance facilities are electrified with overhead lines.

== History ==
The trains were built from 1970 until 1984, and entered passenger service on March 1, 1972, together with the official opening of the Nuremberg U-Bahn system. DT1 units were lent to Munich on two occasions, were they operated on the Munich U-Bahn system. They were in service in Munich in 1972, which had a shortage of rolling stock during the 1972 Summer Olympics and in 1980, during the visit of Pope John Paul II. Following their service in Munich, units 401/402, 403/404, 409/410, 423/424, 425/426 and 427/428 carried commemorative stickers with the Munich Coat of Arms next to the doors of the driving cabs.

Twelve sets were scrapped in 2010. The DT1 trains have since been replaced by new VAG Class G1 trains, which entered service in mid-2019. One DT1 train will be preserved.
