= Twin unit =

Two railcars operating together as one

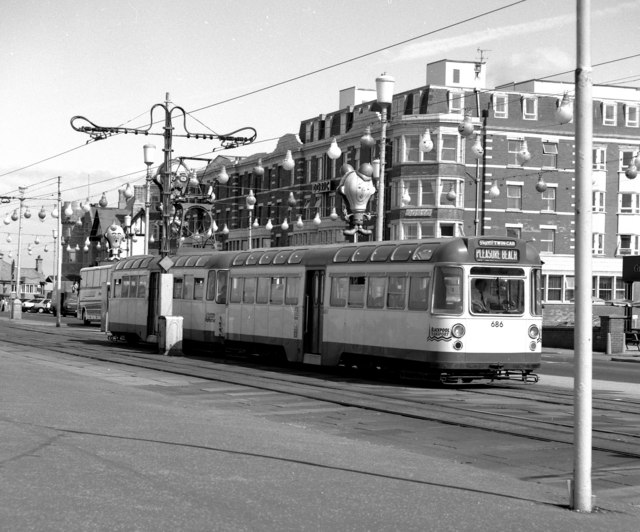
Twinset tram in Blackpool, UK

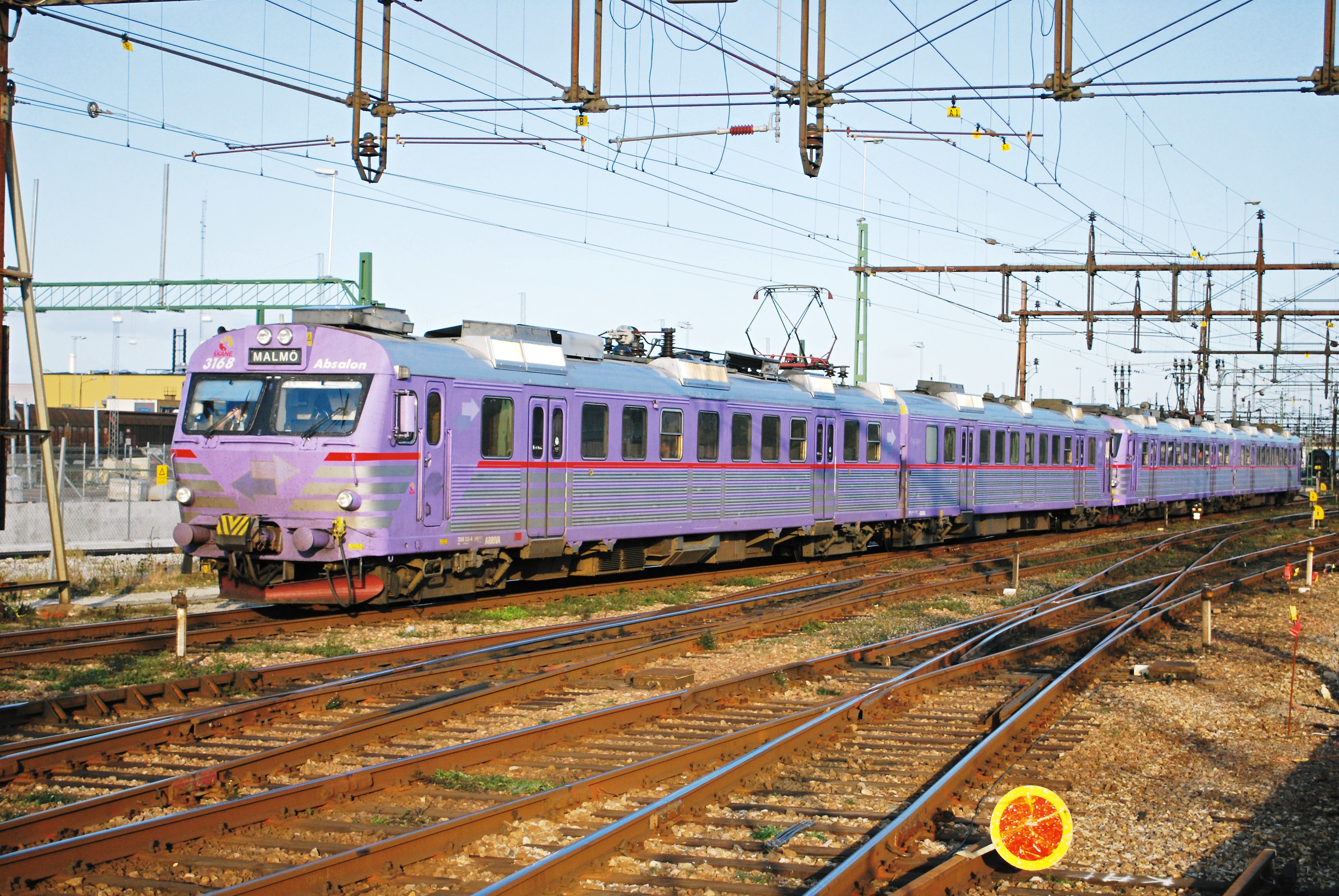
Two coupled Swedish X11 twinsets in Malmö

A twin unit, twinset, or double unit is a set of two railroad cars or locomotives which are permanently coupled and treated as if they were a single unit. A twinset of cars or coaches can also be called a twin car. In US passenger railroad parlance, twin units are also known as married pairs.

On passenger railroads, light rail, and monorail services, married pairs may have machinery necessary for full operation of the cars split between them. Items that are typically shared include transformers, motor controllers, dynamic braking grids, cabs, current collectors, batteries, and air compressors. This provides significant savings in both cost of equipment and weight, which increases performance and decreases energy consumption. The cost of operating such a pair may be slightly higher when the extra car in such a pair is not needed to meet level-of-service demands at a particular time.

== See also ==
- Cow–calf
- Multiple unit
- Control car
