= List of acronyms: N =

This list contains acronyms, initialisms, and pseudo-blends that begin with the letter N.

For the purposes of this list:

- acronym = an abbreviation pronounced as if it were a word, e.g., SARS = severe acute respiratory syndrome, pronounced to rhyme with cars
- initialism = an abbreviation pronounced wholly or partly using the names of its constituent letters, e.g., CD = compact disc, pronounced cee dee
- pseudo-blend = an abbreviation whose extra or omitted letters mean that it cannot stand as a true acronym, initialism, or portmanteau (a word formed by combining two or more words).

(a) = acronym, e.g.: SARS – (a) severe acute respiratory syndrome
(i) = initialism, e.g.: CD – (i) compact disc
(p) = pseudo-blend, e.g.: UNIFEM – (p) United Nations Development Fund for Women
(s) = symbol (none of the above, representing and pronounced as something else; for example: MHz – megahertz)

Some terms are spoken as either acronym or initialism, e.g., VoIP, pronounced both as voyp and V-O-I-P.

(Main list of acronyms)

- n – (s) Nano
- N – (s) Newton – Nitrogen – North

== N0–9 ==
- N3F – (i) National Fantasy Fan Federation

== NA ==
- na – (s) Nauruan language (ISO 639-1 code)
- nA – (s) Nanoampere
- Na – (s) Sodium (Latin Natrium)
- NA
  - (s) Namibia (ISO 3166 digram)
  - (i) Narcotics Anonymous
  - National Archives
  - Negative Acknowledge
- N/A
  - (i) Neurotics Anonymous
  - not available/applicable
- NAA – (p) N-Acetylaspartate
- NAAD – (i) North American Air Defense
- NAAFI
  - (a) Navy, Army and Air Force Institute (UK)
  - (a) No Ambition And Fuckall Interest (RSA army slang)
- NAAK – (a) Mark I NAAK, Nerve Agent Antidote Kit
- NAACP – (i) National Association for the Advancement of Colored People ("N double-A CP")
- NAAQS – (a) National Ambient Air Quality Standards
- NAAWS – (i) NATO Anti-Air Warfare System
- NABCI – (a) North American Bird Conservation Initiative ("nab-see")
- NAC
  - (i/a) National Agency Check
  - U.S. Naval Avionics Center
  - U.S. Navy Advanced Concepts
  - NOAD ADVENDO Combinatie, the full name of the Dutch football club NAC Breda
  - North Atlantic Council
  - Northern Area Command
- NACA – (i) (U.S.) National Advisory Committee for Aeronautics (1915–1958, became NASA)
- NACC – (i) North Atlantic Cooperation Council
- NACISA – (a) NATO Communications and Information Systems Agency
- NACMA – (p) NATO Air Command and Control System Management Agency
- NACRA – (a) North America Caribbean Rugby Association (more specifically rugby union), a former name of Rugby Americas North
- NACS – (i) North American Charging System, a charging connector standard for electric vehicles
- NAD – (s) Namibian dollar (ISO 4217 currency code)
- NAEC – (i) U.S. Naval Air Engineering Center
- NAF
  - (a) NATO Architecture Framework
  - (i) Naval Air Facility
- NAFLD – (i) Non Alcoholic Fatty Liver Disease (now known as MASLD - Metabolic dysfunction–associated steatotic liver disease)
- NAFO – (a) Northwest Atlantic Fisheries Organization
- NAFERA – (a) Native American Free Exercise of Religion Act
- NAFTA – (a) North American Free Trade Agreement
- NAGPRA – (a) Native American Graves Protection and Repatriation Act
- NAI
  - (i) Named Area of Interest
  - Network Access Identifier
- NAICS – (a) North American Industry Classification System
- NAIL – (i) Neurotics Anonymous
- NAILS – (a) National Airspace Integrated Logistics System
- NAIRU – (a) Non Accelerating Inflation Rate of Unemployment
- NAK – (p) Negative Acknowledge
- NAM – (s) Namibia (ISO 3166 trigram)
- NAMBLA – (a) North American Man-Boy Love Association
- NAMRL – (i) Naval Aerospace Medical Research Laboratory
- NaN – (i) Not A Number (computing)
- NANP – (i) North American Numbering Plan (telephone)
- NAO – (i) UK National Audit Office
- NAPDD – (i) Non-Acquisition Program Definition Document ("nap-dee-dee")
- NAPS – (a) Navy Acquisition Procedures Supplement
- NARA – (i) (U.S.) National Archives and Records Administration
- NARAL – (a) National Abortion Rights Action League
- NARDAC – (a) Naval Regional Data Automation Center
- NARDIC – (a) U.S. Navy Acquisition Research and Development Information Center
- NARP – (a) Non-Athletic Regular Person
- NARPV – (i) National Association for Remotely Piloted Vehicles
- NAS
  - (i) National Academy of Sciences
  - National Air Space
  - National Audubon Society
  - Naval Air Station
  - New Attack Submarine
- NASA
  - (a) National Aeronautics and Space Administration
  - North American Saxophone Alliance
- NASB – (i) New American Standard Bible
- NASCAR – (a) National Association for Stock Car Auto Racing
- NASDAQ – (a) National Association of Securities Dealers Automated Quotations
- NASED – (a) National Association of State Election Directors
- NASH – (a) Non-Alcoholic Steatohepatitis
- NASP
  - (p) National Aerospace Plane
  - (i) National Archery in the Schools Program
- NASS – (a) National Association of Secretaries of State
- NASUWT - National Association of Schoolmasters / Union of Women Teachers (UK trade union)
- NatGeo - (a) National Geographic
- NATO
  - (a) National Association of Theatre Owners
  - North Atlantic Treaty Organization
- nau – (s) Nauruan language (ISO 639-2 code)
- NaUKMA – (p) National University of Kyiv-Mohyla Academy
- nav – (s) Navajo language (ISO 639-2 code)
- NAV – (p) Navigation[al]
- NAVCAMS – (p) Naval Communications Area Master Station
- NAVCC – (p) National Audio-Visual Conservation Center
- NAVCC (Navy) – (p) Navy Component Commander
- NAVCENT – (p) Naval Forces U.S. Central Command
- NAVDAC – (p) Naval Data Automation Command
- NAVEUR – (p) Naval Forces U.S. European Command
- NAVFE – (p) U.S. Naval Forces, Far East
- NAVFOR – (p) Naval Force
- NAVMACS – (p) Naval Modular Automatic Communication Subsystem
- NAVNET – (p) Navy Network
- NAVS – (a) Non-Cooperative Airborne Vector Scoring
- NAVSAT – (p) Navigation Satellite
- NAVSPACECOM – (p) U.S. Navy Space Command
- NAVSPASUR – (p) U.S. Naval Space Surveillance System
- NAVSTAR – (p) Navigation Satellite Timing And Ranging
- NAVTACNET – (p) Navy Tactical Network
- NAWC – (i) U.S. Naval Air Warfare Center
- NAWIRA – (a) North America and West Indies Rugby Association, the original name of the organization now known as Rugby Americas North
- NAWMP – (a) North American Waterfowl Management Plan ("gnaw-wump")

== NB ==
- nb – (s) Norwegian Bokmål language (ISO 639-1 code)
- Nb – (s) Niobium
- NB – (s) New Brunswick (postal symbol) – (i) nota bene (Latin, "mark well")
- NBA – (i) National Basketball Association
- NBACC – (i) U.S. National Biodefense Analysis and Countermeasures Center ("enn-back")
- NBC – (i) National Broadcasting Corporation – Nuclear, Biological, and Chemical
- NBCRS – (i) NBC (Nuclear, Biological, and Chemical) Reconnaissance System
- NBIC – (i) Nanotechnology, Biotechnology, Information Technology, Cognitive Science
- nbl – (s) Southern Ndebele language (ISO 639-2 code)
- NBL – (a) National Basketball League (Australia)
- NBT – (p) Nitroblue tetrazolium (assay)

== NC ==
- nC – (s) Nanocoulomb
- NC
  - (i) Network Computer
  - (s) New Caledonia (ISO 3166 digram)
  - (i) Node Center
  - Nonconsensual
  - Normally Closed
  - (s) North Carolina (postal symbol)
- NCA – (i) National Command Authority
- NC3A or NC^{3}A – (i) NATO Consultation, Command and Control Agency
- NCAA – (i) National Collegiate Athletic Association ("NC double A")
- NCAR – (i) U.S. National Center for Atmospheric Research
- NCB – (i) National Codification Bureau
- NCCAM – (i) U.S. National Center for Complementary and Alternative Medicine
- NCCUSL – (i) National Conference of Commissioners on Uniform State Laws (U.S.)
- NCDDR – (i) U.S. National Center for the Dissemination of Disability Research
- NCES
  - (i) U.S. National Center for Education Statistics
  - Net-Centric Enterprise Services
- NCI – (i) U.S. National Cancer Institute
- NCIS
  - (i) National Criminal Intelligence Service (British)
  - Naval Criminal Investigative Service (U.S. Navy; see also NCIS, a U.S. TV series based on this unit)
- NCL – (s) New Caledonia (ISO 3166 trigram)
- NCLR – (i) National Council of La Raza
- NCMO – (i) No Commitment Make Out
- NCND
  - (i) Noncircumvention and Nondisclosure
  - (i) Neither Confirm Nor Deny
- NCO – (i) Noncommissioned Officer
- NCP – (i) Net Contracted Purchases
- NCR – (i) National Cash Register Co.
- NCTR – (i) Noncooperative Target Recognition
- NCW – (i) Network Centric Warfare

== ND ==
- nd – (s) Northern Ndebele language (ISO 639-1 code)
- Nd – (s) Neodymium
- N.D. – (i) Nobilis Domina (noble woman)
- ND
  - (i) Nondisclosure
  - (s) North Dakota (postal symbol)
- NDA - (i) Non-Disclosure Agreement
- NDAA – (i) U.S. National Defense Authorization Act
- NDBP – (i) Non-Departmental Public Body (Scotland)
- NDC - (i) National Drug Code
- NDCC – (i) New Directions Counseling Center (Concord, California)
- nde – (s) Northern Ndebele language (ISO 639-2 code)
- NDH
  - (i) Neue Deutsche Härte (German, "new German hardness"—heavy metal genre)
  - Nezavisna Država Hrvatska (Croatian, "Independent State of Croatia"—Nazi puppet state)
- ndo – (s) Ndonga language (ISO 639-2 code)
- N-dof or NDOF – (i) Number of Degrees of Freedom
- NDP – (i) New Democratic Party (Canada)
- NDS – Nintendo DS
- NDU – (i) National Defense University (Washington, DC)

== NE ==
- ne – (s) Nepali language (ISO 639-1 code)
- Ne – (s) Neon
- NE
  - (s) Nebraska (postal symbol)
  - Niger (ISO 3166 digram)
  - (i) North-East
- NEA
  - (i) National Education Association (U.S. labor union)
  - Near-Earth Asteroid
  - Nuclear Energy Agency (OECD)
- NEAT
  - Near-Earth Asteroid Tracking - (a)
  - National Emergency Access Target (a) (Au Health)
- NEC
  - (i) Network-enabled capability
  - Nijmegen Eendracht Combinatie (Dutch, "Nijmegen Unity Combination"; football club formed by the 1910 merger of the Nijmegen and Eendracht clubs)
  - Nippon Electric Company, the original English-language name of the company now known as NEC
  - (p) Northeast Conference (U.S. college sports)
- NED – (s) Netherlands (IOC and FIFA trigram, but not ISO 3166)
- NECTEC – (a) National Electronics and Computer Technology Center (Thailand)
- NEI
  - (i) National Eye Institute
  - Not Enough Information
  - Nuclear Energy Institute
- NEIC (i)
  - U.S. National Earthquake Information Center
  - National Economic Intelligence Committee (Nigeria)
  - National Energy Information Center (U.S. DOE)
  - National Enforcement Investigations Center (U.S. EPA)
- nem con – (p) nemine contradicente (Latin, "no one contradicting")
- nem diss – (p) nemine dissentiente (Latin, "no one dissenting")
- NEMS – (i) National Energy Modeling System (USDOE-EIA)
- NEO
  - (i) Near-Earth Object
  - Non-combatant Evacuation Operations
- nep – (s) Nepali language (ISO 639-2 code)
- NEPA – (a) National Environmental Policy Act
- NER – (s) Niger (ISO 3166 trigram)
- NERF - (a) Non-Expanding Recreational Foam
- NERICA – (p) New Rice for Africa
- NESDIS – (a) National Environmental Satellite, Data and Information Service
- NESP – (i) NSA/CSS Enterprise Standards Program
- NESS-T – (p) Near-Earth Space Surveillance – Terrestrial project
- NET
  - (i) National Educational Television
  - (i/a) NCAA Evaluation Tool, a metric used in the NCAA Division I men's and women's basketball tournament selection process
- NETCU – (i) (UK) National Extremism Tactical Co-ordination Unit
- NETL – (a) (US) National Energy Technology Laboratory
- NETWARS – (p) Network Warfare Simulation
- NEWHA – (i) New England Women's Hockey Alliance
- NEWS
  - (a) Navy Electronic Warfare Simulator
  - North, East, West, South
- NEX – (p) Navy EXchange

== NF ==
- nF – (s) Nanofarad
- NF
  - (s) Newfoundland (and Labrador) (obsolete postal code, replaced by NL)
  - Norfolk Island (ISO 3166 digram)
- NFA
  - (i) (U.S.) National Firearms Act (often used to refer to the guns and accessories regulated under this law)
  - No-Fire Area
- NFC
  - (i) National Football Conference
  - Near-field communication
- NFER – (i) National Foundation for Educational Research
- NFG – (i) No F**king Good
- NFHS – (i) National Federation of State High School Associations
- NFI – (i) Not F****** Interested
- NFK – (s) Norfolk Island (ISO 3166 trigram)
- NFL
  - (i) National Football League
  - National Forensic League, original name of the National Speech and Debate Association
  - No-Fire Line
- Nfld – (p) Newfoundland
- NFPA – (a) National Fluid Power Association (United States)
- NFT
  - (p) Neurofibrillary tangle
  - (i) No Further Text
  - Non-fungible token
- NFS
  - (i) Network File System

== NG ==
- ng – (s) Nanogram – Ndonga language (ISO 639-1 code)
- NG
  - (i) Natural Gas
  - Next Generation
  - (s) Niger (FIPS 10-4 country code)
  - Nigeria (ISO 3166 digram)
- NGA
  - (i) National Geospatial-Intelligence Agency
  - (s) Nigeria (ISO 3166 trigram)
- NGH – Northern General Hospital
- ngl – (i) Not gonna lie
- NGATS – (i) New Generation Army Targetry System
- NGIC – (a) National Ground Intelligence Center ("Injick")
- NGN – (s) Nigerian naira (ISO 4217 currency code)
- NGO – (i) non-governmental organization
- NGR – (s) Nigeria (IOC trigram, but not ISO 3166 or FIFA)
- NGS – (i) Naval Gunfire Support

== NH ==
- nH – (s) Nanohenry
- NH – (s) New Hampshire (postal symbol) – New Hebrides (ISO 3166 digram; obsolete 1980) – Vanuatu (FIPS 10-4 country code; from New Hebrides)
- N.H. – (i) Nobilis Homo (noble man)
- NHANES – (i) National Health and Nutrition Examination Survey
- NHB – (s) New Hebrides (ISO 3166 trigram; obsolete 1980)
- NHB – (i) No holds barred
- NHL – (i) National Hockey League
- NHO – (i) Næringslivets Hovedorganisasjon (Confederation of Norwegian Enterprises, a Norwegian employers' organisation)
- NHRA – (i) National Hot Rod Association
- NHS – (i) National Health Service (UK)

== NI ==
- Ni – (s) Nickel
- NI
  - (s) Nicaragua (ISO 3166 digram)
  - Nigeria (FIPS 10-4 country code)
- NIAAA – (i) U.S. National Institute on Alcohol Abuse and Alcoholism
- NIAID – (a) National Institute of Allergies and Infectious Disease
- NIAG – (a) NATO Industrial Advisory Group
- NIAMD – (i) National Institute of Arthritis and Musculoskeletal Diseases
- NIB – (i) New In Box (Internet auction/trading listings)
- NIBP – (i) Non-invasive blood pressure monitor
- NIC
  - (a) Network Interface Card
  - (s) Nicaragua (ISO 3166 trigram)
- NicA – (i) Nicotine Anonymous
- NICAP – (a) National Investigations Committee on Aerial Phenomena
- NICE – (p) UK. National Institute for Health and Clinical Excellence
- NICHD – National Institute of Child Health and Human Development
- NICP – (i) National Inventory Control Point
- NIDDK – (i) National Institute of Diabetes and Digestive and Kidney Diseases
- NIDRR – (i) National Institute on Disability Research and Rehabilitation
- NIEHS – (i) National Institute of Environmental Health Sciences
- NIG – (s) Niger (IOC and FIFA trigram, but not ISO 3166)
- NIH
  - (i) National Institutes of Health
  - Not Invented Here
- NIIN – (i) National Item Identification Number
- NIL
  - (i) Name, image, and likeness (referring to U.S. student athlete compensation)
  - (p) Nanoimprint lithography
  - (i) Nomina im Indogermanischen Lexikon (German, "Nominals in the Indo-European Lexicon") – etymological dictionary of Proto-Indo-European nominals
- NIMA – (a) National Imagery and Mapping Agency (became NGA)
- NIMBY – (a) Not In My Back Yard (See NOME)
- NIMG – (i) Not In My Generation
- NiMH – (p) nickel metal hydride ("Ni" is the chemical symbol for nickel)
- NIMH
  - (i) National Institute of Medical Herbalists
  - National Institute of Mental Health
- NIN – (i) Nine Inch Nails (band)
- NIO – (s) Nicaraguayan cordoba oro (ISO 4217 currency code)
- NIOSH – (a) National Institute for Occupational Safety and Health (U.S.)
- NIPR – (i) National Institute of Polar Research (Japan)
- NIPT - Non-Invasive Prenatal Testing
- NIR – (s) Northern Ireland (FIFA trigram; not eligible for an ISO 3166 or IOC trigram)
- NISAC – (a) U.S. National Infrastructure Simulation and Analysis Center
- NISCAP – (a) NSA Information System Certification and Accreditation Program
- NISER – (i) National Institute of Science Education and Research
- NIST – (a/i) National Institute of Standards and Technology
- NIT
  - (i) National Invitation Tournament (U.S. college basketball)
  - (i) National Institutes of Technology (India)
- NITFS – (i) National Imagery Transmission Format Standard
- NIU – (s) Niue (ISO 3166 trigram)
- NIV
  - (i) New International Version (Bible translation)
  - Non-invasive ventilation

== NJ ==
- nJ – (s) Nanojoule
- NJ – (s) New Jersey (postal symbol)
- NJHS – (s) National Junior Honor Society
- NJPW – (i) New Japan Pro-Wrestling

== NK ==
- nK – (s) Nanokelvin
- NKA – No Known Allergies
- N/K/A – Now Known As
- NKJV – (i) New King James Version (Bible translation)
- NKVD – (i) Narodnyi Komissariat Vnutrennikh Del (Russian "People's Commissariat of Internal Affairs") (1934–1954)

== NL ==
- nl – (s) Dutch language (ISO 639-1 code)
- nL – (s) Nanolitre
- NL
  - (s) Netherlands (ISO 3166 and FIPS 10-4 country code digram)
  - Newfoundland and Labrador (postal symbol)
- NLB – (i) Non-Linear Battlefield
- nld – (s) Dutch language (ISO 639-2 code)
- NLD – (s) Netherlands (ISO 3166 trigram)
- NLF – (i) National Liberation Front (disambiguation)
- NLL – (i) National Lacrosse League
- NLIC - (p) NetLicensing (license file extension)
- NLOS-LS – (i) Non Line Of Sight-Launch System
- NLP
  - (i) Natural Language Processing
  - Neuro-Linguistic Programming (pseudoscience)
- NLW – (i) Non-Lethal Weapon

== NM ==
- nm – (s) nanometer
- nm, NM – Nautical mile
- N·m, Nm – Newton meter
- NM – (s) New Mexico (postal symbol)
- NMCI – (i) Navy Marine Corps Intranet
- NMCS – (i) Not Mission Capable Supply (SM&R code)
- NMD – (i) U.S. National Missile Defense
- NMN – (i) No middle name
- NMOS – (i/a) N-type/Negative Metal-Oxide-Semiconductor transistor ("enn-moss")
- NMSG – (i) NATO Modelling and Simulation Group
- NMR – (i) Nuclear Magnetic Resonance
- NMHNFG – (i) Not Made Here, No Fucking Good

== NN ==
- nn – (s) Norwegian Nynorsk language (ISO 639-1 code)
- nN – (s) Nanonewton
- NNW – (i) North North-East
- nno – (s) Norwegian Nynorsk language (ISO 639-2 code)
- NNSA – (i) U.S. National Nuclear Security Administration
- NNW – (i) North North-West

== NO ==
- no – (s) Norwegian language (ISO 639-1 code)
- No – (s) Nobelium
- NO
  - (s) Nitric Oxide
  - (i) Normally Open
  - (s) Norway (ISO 3166 and FIPS 10-4 country code digram)
- NOAA – (a) U.S. National Oceanic and Atmospheric Administration
- NOAF – (i) Norwegian Air Force
- NOAO – (i) National Optical Astronomy Observatory
- nob – (s) Norwegian Bokmål language (ISO 639-2 code)
- NOC – (i) UK. National Oceanography Centre
- NODEF – (a) NATO Oceanographic Data Exchange Format
- No-FEAR – (p) Notification and Federal Employee Antidiscrimination Retaliation Act (2002)
- NOK – (s) Norwegian krone (ISO 4217 currency code)
- NOLA – (p) New Orleans, Louisiana (LA is the official postal code for Louisiana)
- NOGI – (a) New Orleans Grande Isle (award for diving)
- NOLF – (i) Navy OutLying Field
- NOM – (i) Novus Ordo Missae or New Ordinary of the Mass (sometimes abbreviated to simply "NO")
- NOME – Not on Mars Either
- NoMBO – (p) Non-mine, Mine-like Bottom Object
- NOME – Not on Mars Either (see NIMBY)
- NOPA – (i) National Office Products Alliance – National Office Products Association
- nor – (s) Norwegian language (ISO 639-2 code)
- NOR – (s) Norway (ISO 3166 trigram)
- NORAD – (p) North American Aerospace Defense Command
- NORCECA – (p) North, Central America and Caribbean Volleyball Confederation
- NORELPREF – No religious preference
- NORML – (a) National Organization for the Reform of Marijuana Laws ("normal")
- NORTHAG – (p) Northern Army Group
- NOS
  - (i) Network Operating System
  - New Old Stock (Internet auction/trading listings)
  - Nitric Oxide Synthase (enzyme)
- NOSA – (i) NATO OSI Security Architecture
- NOTAFLOF – (a) No One Turned Away For Lack Of Funds
- NOTAM – (p) Notice to Airmen
- NOW – (a) National Organization for Women

== NP ==
- Np
  - (p) Neap tide (nautical charts)
  - (s) Neptunium
- NP
  - (s) National Permit (authorization used in India to allow trucks to go anywhere in the nation)
  - Nepal (ISO 3166 and FIPS 10-4 country code digram)
- NPB – (i) Nippon Professional Baseball
- NPC
  - (i) National Postgraduate Committee
  - National Provincial Championship (New Zealand rugby competition)
  - Navigation Planning Chart
  - Non-Player Character (role-playing games)
- NPCS – (i) Non-Passenger Coaching stock (in Railways)
- NPD – (i) Nationaldemokratische Partei Deutschlands (German)
- NPDI – (i) New Product Development and Introduction
- NPG – (i) Needline/Network Participation Group
- NPH – (i) Normal Pressure Hydrocephalus
- NPL
  - (i) National Priorities List
  - (s) Nepal (ISO 3166 trigram)
- NPPU - Nose Personal Protection Unit (copper nose insert)
- NPOV – (i) Neutral Point Of View
- NPR
  - (i) National Public Radio
  - (s) Nepalese rupee (ISO 4217 currency code)

== NQ ==
- NQ – (s) Dronning Maud Land (ISO 3166 digram; obsolete 1983)
- NQOCD – (i) Not Quite Our Class, Dear (or Darling). (Upper-class English slang)
- NPO – nothing by mouth

== NR ==
- nr – (s) Southern Ndebele language (ISO 639-1 code)
- NR – (s) Nauru (ISO 3166 and FIPS 10-4 country code digram)
- NRA
  - (i) National Republican Army (Russia)
  - National Revolutionary Army (China)
  - National Rifle Association (disambiguation)
- NRAO – (i) National Radio Astronomy Observatory
- NRC
  - (i) National Register of Citizens (India)
  - National Research Council (U.S.)
  - Nuclear Regulatory Commission (U.S.)
- NRDC – (i) (U.S.) Natural Resources Defense Council
- NREL – (i) U.S. National Renewable Energy Laboratory
- NRK – (p) Norsk Rikskringkasting (Norwegian Broadcasting Corporation)
- NRLA – (i) New Railway Link through the Alps
- NRMP – (i) National Resident Matching Program (U.S. medicine)
- NRO – (i) U.S. National Reconnaissance Office
- NRT – (i) Near Real Time
- NRTA
  - (i) National Retail Tenants Association
  - National Retired Teachers Association
  - Northwest Regional Transmission Association
- NRU – (s) Nauru (ISO 3166 trigram)

== NS ==
- ns – (s) Nanosecond
- nS – (s) Nanosiemens
- NS
  - (s) Norfolk Southern Railway (AAR reporting mark)
  - Nova Scotia (postal symbol)
  - Suriname (FIPS 10-4 country code)
- NSA
  - (i) U.S. National Security Agency
  - Naval Support Activity
  - No Strings Attached
- NSABB – (i) National Science Advisory Board for Biosecurity
- NSAID – (i) Non-Steroidal Anti-Inflammatory Drug
- NSB – (i) Norges Statsbaner (Norwegian State Railways)
- NSBM – (i) National Socialist black metal
- NSC – National Security Council
- NSDA – (i) National Speech and Debate Association (US)
- NSDAP – (i) Nationalsozialistische Deutsche Arbeiterpartei (German: "German National Socialist Workers Party", the formal name of the Nazi Party)
- NSDL – (i) National Science Digital Library (US)
- NSG – (i) National System for Geospatial-Intelligence
- NSN – (i) National Stock Number
- NSO – (i) National Standardization Office (ABCA)
- NSS – (i) (U.S.) Naval Simulation System
- NST – (i) (UK) Nimrod Software Team
- NSTAC – (i) National Security Telecommunications Advisory Committee
- NSV – (i) Nikitin-Sokolov-Volkov heavy machine gun (Russian НСВ Никитина-Соколова-Волкова) ru:ПулеметНСВ-12,7 "Утес"
- NSW – (i) New South Wales (postal symbol)

== NT ==
- N/T – (Aa) No text
- nT – (s) Nanotesla
- NT
  - (i) National Trust (UK)
  - (s) Saudi–Iraqi neutral zone (ISO 3166 digram; obsolete 1993)
  - (i) New Technology (Windows NT)
  - (s) Northern Territory (Australia) (postal symbol)
  - Northwest Territories (Canada) (postal symbol)
- NTC
  - (i) National Training Center
  - Negative Temperature Coefficient (thermistor)
- NTDS – (i) Naval Tactical Data System
- NTP – (i) Network Time Protocol
- NTR – (i) Network Time Reference
- NTRA – (i) National Thoroughbred Racing Association
- NTSB – (i) National Transportation Safety Board
- NTSC – (i) National Television Standards Committee (colloquially, Never Twice the Same Color)
- (i) (Internet Abbreviation:) Nothing To See Here
- NTV – (i) Non-Tactical Vehicle
- NTY – (i) (Internet Abbreviations:) Not Tested Yet; (Alternatively) No Thank You
- NTZ – (s) Iraq-Saudi Arabia Neutral Zone (ISO 3166 trigram; obsolete 1993)

== NU ==
- NU
  - (s) Nicaragua (FIPS 10-4 country code)
  - Niue (ISO 3166 digram)
  - Nunavut (postal symbol)
- NUI – (a) No user interface ("noo-ey")
- NUL
  - (i) Null character (ASCII code of control character)
  - National Urban League
- NUTS – (a) Nuclear Utilization Target Selection
- NUWC – (i) U.S. Naval Undersea Warfare Center

== NV ==
- nv – (s) Navajo language (ISO 639-1 code)
- nV – (s) Nanovolt
- NV
  - (i) Naamloze vennootschap (Dutch, "innominate partnership" or "anonymous venture"; i.e. a public limited-liability company)
  - (s) Nevada (postal symbol)
- NVEOL – (i) Night Vision and Electro-Optics Laboratory
- NVESD – (i) CERDEC Night Vision and Electronic Sensors Directorate, Fort Belvoir, Virginia
- NVG – (i) Night Vision Goggles
- NVL – (i) Night Vision Laboratory

== NW ==
- nW – (s) Nanowatt
- NW – (s) North-West
- NW – (i) Nuclear Weapon
- NWA – (i) National Wrestling Alliance
- NWF – (i) National Wildlife Federation
- NWFZ – (i) Nuclear-Weapon-Free Zone
- NWHN – (i) U.S. National Women's Health Network
- nWo – (i) New World Order (see article for explanation of idiosyncratic capitalization)
- NWOAHM – (i) New Wave of American Heavy Metal
- NWOBHM – (i) New wave of British heavy metal (sometimes pronounced /nəˈwɒbəm/ as if it were an acronym)
- NWRA – (i) National Wildlife Rehabilitators Association
- NWSL - (i) National Women's Soccer League (U.S.)
- NWT – (i) North-West Territories

== NX ==
- NX
  - (p) Part of computer memory marked as "no execute"
  - (i) Automobile made by Nissan
  - (s) unit of illuminance
  - (p) National Express
  - Net exports
- NXA – (i) 21st arcade game in the Pump It Up series
- NXD – (p) Native XML
- NXE – (i) New Xbox Experience
- NXG – (p) New Cross Gate station
- NXL – (i) National XBall League
- NXN – (p) Nike Cross Nationals
- NXP – (p) "Next Experience" Semiconductors

== NY ==
- ny – (s) Chichewa language (ISO 639-1 code)
- NY – (s) New York (postal symbol)
- nya – (s) Chichewa language (ISO 639-2 code)
- NYHA – (i) New York Heart Association
- NYO – (i) National Youth Orchestra of Great Britain
- NYRA
  - (i) National Youth Rights Association
  - (a) New York Racing Association (horse racing)
- NYSE – (i) New York Stock Exchange
- NYT (disambiguation) – (i) The New York Times

== NZ ==
- NZ – (s) New Zealand (ISO 3166 and FIPS 10-4 country code digram)
- NZC – (i) New Zealand Cricket
- NZD – (s) New Zealand dollar (ISO 4217 currency code)
- NZL – (s) New Zealand (ISO 3166 trigram)
- NzL – Noze looan (online/event listings)
- NZOSS – (i) New Zealand Open Source Society
- NZR
  - (i) New Zealand Railways
  - New Zealand Rugby (governing body for rugby union)
- NZRU – (i) New Zealand Rugby Union, the former name of the organisation now known as New Zealand Rugby
