= NVS =

NVS may refer to:

== Businesses ==
- NVS Telematic Systems, a Russian manufacturer of navigation systems (founded 2011)
- Novartis, a Swiss pharmaceutical multinational (founded 1996; NYSE ticker: NVS)

== Computer parts ==
- Non-volatile storage, a type of computer memory
- Nvidia Quadro NVS (and NVS M), a line of graphics cards
- NVSwitch, a communication system between GPUs on Nvidia DGX-2 servers

== Education ==
- Navodaya Vidyalaya Samiti, an Indian school system
- New Village School, Sausalito, California, US

== See also ==
- NV (disambiguation)
