= Nas (disambiguation) =

Nas (born 1973) is the stage name of American rapper Nasir Jones.

Nas, NaS, or NAS may also refer to:

== Aviation ==
- Nasair, a low-cost airline carrier and subsidiary based in Eritrea
- National Air Services, an airline in Saudi Arabia
  - Nas Air (Saudi Arabia), a low-cost airline carrier and subsidiary of National Air Services
- National Aerospace Standards, industry standards for aviation in the United States
- National Airports System, an organization system of larger or important airports in Canada
- National Airspace System, an aviation control system in the United States
- Naval air squadron, an aircraft-focused unit associated with a navy
- Naval air station, a military air base associated with a navy
- Norwegian Air Shuttle, an airline in Norway
- National Aviation Services, an aviation services provider headquartered in Kuwait

== Commerce ==
- Nihon Ad Systems, a Japanese anime company
- No age statement, for a Scotch whisky

== Organizations ==
- Nationaal Arbeids-Secretariaat, a trade union federation in the Netherlands 1893-1940
- National Academy of Sciences (see below under Science & Technology)
- National Academy of Songwriters
- National Academy of Sports (Philippines)
- HSE National Ambulance Service of Ireland
- National Apprenticeship Service, UK
- National Archives of Scotland, Edinburgh
- National Association of Scholars, US
- Former National Association of Schoolmasters, UK
- National Association of Seadogs, a Nigerian confraternity
- National Audubon Society, US conservancy organization
- National Autistic Society, UK
- National Salvation Front (South Sudan), a militant group
- Nautical Archaeology Society, UK
- Nord Anglia International School Dubai

== People ==
- Lil Nas X (born 1999), American rapper
- Nas Majeed, contestant on the sixth series of Love Island
- Digital Nas (born 1998), American record producer
- Mehmet Nas (born 1979), Turkish footballer
- Nesrin Nas (born 1958), Turkish academic
- Nuseir Yassin (born 1992), Arab-Israeli Vlogger, creator of Nas Daily

== Places ==
- Lynden Pindling International Airport (IATA airport code NAS), near Nassau, Bahamas
- Nas (Ikaria), a village in the Greek island of Icaria

== Religion ==
- al-Nas, Islamic scriptural chapter in the Quran
- New American Standard Bible, a 1971 English translation of the Bible
- Nordic Asa-Community (Swedish: Nordiska Asa-samfundet), a neopagan organisation in Sweden

== Science and technology ==
- National Academy of Sciences (disambiguation)

=== Biology, chemistry and medicine ===
- N-Acetylserotonin, also known as normelatonin, a neurotransmitter
- NaS battery, a sodium–sulfur battery
- Neonatal abstinence syndrome, a drug withdrawal syndrome found in infants that have been administered drugs
- Normative Aging Study, a long-term study of the health effects of aging
- Nucleophilic acyl substitution, a reaction in organic chemistry
- Nucleophilic aromatic substitution, a reaction in organic chemistry

=== Computing and networks ===
- NASA Advanced Supercomputing Division
- NetWare Access Server, a Novell product
- Network access server
- Network-attached storage
- Neural architecture search
- Non-access stratum, in wireless networking

== Other uses ==
- National account system, for measuring the economic activity of a nation
- Nerve attenuation syndrome, a fictional disease in the movie Johnny Mnemonic
- The untitled 2008 Nas album, commonly referred to as Nas

== See also ==
- Naas (disambiguation)
- Nass (disambiguation)
- Naz (disambiguation)
