= Independent National Electoral Commission =

Independent National Electoral Commission may refer to:

- Independent National Electoral Commission (Democratic Republic of the Congo)
- Independent National Electoral Commission (Guinea)
- Independent National Electoral Commission (Nigeria)
- Independent National Electoral Commission (Tanzania)

== See also ==
- Sudan National Elections Commission, established 2008
