= NVG =

NVG may refer to:

- Neovascular glaucoma, an eye disease
- New Venture Gear, American automobile maker (1990–2012)
- Night-vision goggles, in optics and the military

== See also ==
- NUG (disambiguation)
- MVG (disambiguation)
