= No Strings (disambiguation) =

No Strings is a 1962 musical drama with a book by Samuel A. Taylor and words and music by Richard Rodgers.

No Strings may also refer to:

== Film and television ==
- No Strings, a 1967 comedy TV film starring Arthur Askey
- No Strings (1974 TV series), a British television comedy by Carla Lane
- No Strings (1989 TV series), a British television comedy
- "No Strings" (VisionQuest), an episode of the miniseries VisionQuest

== Music ==
- No Strings (album), an album by Sheena Easton
- "No Strings (I'm Fancy Free)", a song written by Irving Berlin for the 1935 film Top Hat
- "No Strings" (song), a song by Chloe Howl
- "No Strings", a song by Ed Sheeran from the album -
- "No Strings", a song by X Ambassadors from the album Townie
- "No Strings...", a song by Roots Manuva from the album Run Come Save Me

== See also ==
- No Strings Attached (disambiguation)
