= NFH (disambiguation) =

NFH may refer to

- National Fish Hatchery, see National Fish Hatchery System and List of National Fish Hatcheries in the United States
- NATO Frigate Helicopter, a type of NHIndustries NH90 military helicopter
- Neighbours from Hell, 2003 video game
- Neville Fernando Teaching Hospital, one of the largest private hospitals in Sri Lanka
- Norwegian College of Fishery Science (Norwegian: Norges fiskerihøgskole)
- Nykøbing Falster Håndboldklub, a Danish handball club

== See also ==
- NFHS (disambiguation)
