= NHB =

NHB or nhb may refer to:

- No holds barred (disambiguation), a term originating in catch wrestling that has also been applied to modern mixed martial arts
- National Heritage Board (Singapore), a cultural development board
- National Housing Bank, a state owned bank in India
- Naval Hospital Bremerton, a United States Navy hospital in Bremerton, Washington
- New Headquarters Building (NHB), part of the George Bush Center for Intelligence
- nhb, the ISO 639-3 designation for the Beng language
