= NFPA =

NFPA may refer to:

- National Fire Protection Association
  - NFPA 704, National Fire Protection Association Fire Diamond
- National Food Processors Association
- National Fluid Power Association
- Non-Fossil Purchasing Agency
- Non-functioning pituitary adenoma
