= NBIC =

NBIC may refer to:

- Acronym for the fields of Nanotechnology, Biotechnology, Information technology and Cognitive science
- Namibia Business Innovation Center (see Namibia University of Science and Technology)
- NanKang Biotech Incubation Center, a biotech business incubator in Taipei, Taiwan
- Nano/Bio Interface Center, University of Pennsylvania
- National Board Inspection Code (see National Board of Boiler and Pressure Vessel Inspectors)
- Netherlands Bioinformatics Centre
