= NCES =

NCES may refer to:

- National Center for Education Statistics, part of the U.S. Department of Education
- Net-Centric Enterprise Services, a United States Department of Defense program
- Normal curve equivalents, a type of scale score based on the normal curve

== See also ==
- NCE (disambiguation)
