= NATO Consultation, Command and Control Agency =

Former NATO agency

Coordinates: 52°06′34″N 4°19′30″E

The NATO Consultation, Command and Control Agency (NC3A) was formed in 1996 by merging the SHAPE Technical Centre (STC) in The Hague, Netherlands; and the NATO Communications and Information Systems Agency (NACISA) in Brussels, Belgium. NC3A was part of the NATO Consultation, Command and Control Organization (NC3O) and reported to the NATO Consultation, Command and Control Board (NC3B). In July 2012, NC3A was merged into the NATO Communications and Information Agency (NCIA).

The agency had around 800 staff, of which around 500 were located in The Hague and 300 in Brussels. Broadly speaking, the Netherlands staff were responsible for scientific research, development and experimentation, while the Belgian staff provided technical project management and acquisition support for NATO procurement programmes.

The Agency was organised using a balanced matrix model, with four main areas: the Production area, Sponsor Accounts, Core Segment and Resources Division. The Production area consisted of nine capability area teams (CATs) with various areas of expertise. The Sponsor Accounts area had Directors for each of the Agency's major sponsors, providing a single point of contact with the Agency. The Core Segment comprised a Chief Operating Officer, Chief Technology Officer and Director of Acquisition, who ensured coherency of the Agency's business, technical and acquisition processes respectively. The Resources Division handled Agency operations such as Human Resources, Finance, Graphics, Building Maintenance, etc. Since 2004, the Agency used the PRINCE2 and PMI project management methodologies.

General Manager Georges D'hollander and Deputy General Manager Kevin Scheid split their time between their offices in The Hague and Brussels. Staff were recruited directly from the 28 NATO nations, the majority holding degrees at the Masters level or above. The working language of the Agency was English.

NC3A's prime customers were Allied Command Transformation and Allied Command Operations, as well as the NATO Air Command and Control System (ACCS) Management Agency (NACMA), NATO Airborne Early Warning (NAEW) Force Command and individual NATO nations. Its annual budget was roughly 100 million euros. Major growth areas were the NATO Network Enabled Capability (NNEC), Theatre Missile Defence (TMD) and the Alliance Ground Surveillance and Reconnaissance (AGSR) projects. The Agency traditionally had a strong emphasis on prototyping and aimed to follow a spiral development model.

The agency focused on improving C4ISR interoperability between nations and supporting major acquisition programmes while complementing, not competing with, national research and development.
