= NB =

NB, Nb, or nb may refer to:

== Arts and entertainment ==
- N.B. (album), an album by Natasha Bedingfield
- NB (TV programme), a Scottish arts television programme that aired 1989–1997

== Business ==
- NB Global Monthly Income Fund, a British investment company
- National bank (disambiguation) several banks

== Language ==
- Nota bene, often abbreviated as NB or n.b., a Latin phrase meaning "note well"
- nb, ISO 639-1 code for Bokmål, the written standard of the Norwegian language
- 牛屄 (niúbī), a common word in Mandarin Chinese profanity

== Places ==
- New Brunswick, a province of Canada, (postal abbreviation: NB)
- Nebraska, US, (former postal abbreviation: NB; changed to NE)

== Science and technology ==
- Niobium, symbol Nb, a chemical element
- Naive Bayes classifier, in statistics
- Neuroblastoma, a type of cancer
- Nominal bore or nominal pipe size, a set of standard sizes for pipes
- Nanobarn (nb), a unit of cross-sectional area
- NB (programming language), an intermediate-stage language known as "New B" that evolved from the "B" language and then further evolved into the "C" language
- Switch marking for a radio's Noise blanker, which reduces impulse noise

== Transportation ==
- Niesenbahn, a funicular railway in Switzerland
- Sterling Airlines, a defunct Danish airline (IATA designator)
- NB class, Australian steam locomotives
- Boeing NB, a 1923 training aircraft
- Mazda MX-5 (NB), the second generation of the Mazda MX-5
- Narrowboat ship prefix

== Other uses ==
- National Battlefield, a protected area in the United States
- No-ball in cricket
- Non-binary, a term used by people who identify as neither male nor female
- New Balance, a shoe company
- Nigerian Breweries, a beverage company
- National Bolshevism, a syncretic political movement
