= NEC (disambiguation) =

NEC is a Japanese electronics manufacturer, formerly "Nippon Electric Company".

NEC may refer to:

== Companies, government, and organizations ==
- Nepal Engineering Council, an autonomous government agency of Nepal
- National Economic Commission, a deficit reduction commission in the United States
- National Electoral Commission (Somaliland)
- National Economic Council (United Kingdom)
- National Economic Council (United States) in the Executive Office of the US President
- National Elections Commission, an autonomous government agency of Liberia
- National Electrostatics Corporation, a manufacturer of particle accelerators
- National Empowerment Center, a US mental health advocacy and recovery organization
- National Enterprise Corporation, a state corporation of Uganda
- National Executive Committee of the Labour Party
- National Executive of the Bharatiya Janata Party
- National Executive Committee of the African National Congress
- National Executive Committee for Space-Based Positioning, Navigation and Timing
- Nauru Electoral Commission
- Negro Ensemble Company, New York City theatre company
- National Electricity Company (NEK EAD), a Bulgarian electricity company
- New England Coalition, an anti-nuclear organization based in Brattleboro, VT
- Niagara Escarpment Commission, an agency of the Ontario government
- The ASX stock ticker for Nine Entertainment, an Australian media company
- North Eastern Council
- National Entertainment Commission, a former name of the Media Rating Council
- Sudan National Elections Commission, an electoral management body for Sudan

== Exhibition centres ==
- National Exhibition Centre, the largest exhibition centre in the UK in Birmingham, England
  - NEC Group, the British company operating the National Exhibition Centre and other venues

== Educational institutions ==
- New England Conservatory, America's oldest independent music conservatory
- National Engineering College in Tamil Nadu, India
- National Extension College, a UK specialist in online and distance learning, based in Cambridge
- New England College, a private college in Henniker, New Hampshire
- Native Education Centre, a private college in Vancouver, Canada

== Engineering ==
- National Electrical Code, a US design standard on electrical wiring and equipment in construction
- Numerical Electromagnetics Code, a computer program used to simulate antennas
- New Engineering Contract, a UK system that guides the drafting of documents

== Sports ==
- Teams sponsored by NEC in Japan:
  - NEC Green Rockets, rugby union
  - NEC Red Rockets, women's volleyball
  - NEC Blue Rockets, men's volleyball
- NEC Nijmegen, a Dutch football club
- National Enterprises Corporation FC, a Ugandan football club
- Nueva Ecija Capitals, a Filipino basketball team, the alternate name of Nueva Ecija Rice Vanguards
- NEC, formerly known as the Northeast Conference, an NCAA athletics conference
- Northeastern Conference, a high school athletic conference in Massachusetts, United States
- North Egypt Conference, former Illinois, US high school athletic conference

== Health ==
- No effect concentration in chemical hazards
- Necrotizing enterocolitis, a medical condition usually affecting premature infants
- National Emission Ceiling, part of EU Directive 2001/81/EC regarding air pollution

== Science and mathematics ==
- Non-Euclidean crystallographic group, a group of symmetries in hyperbolic geometry
- Numerical Electromagnetics Code, a computer program used to simulate antennas

== Military ==
- Navy Enlisted Classification, US Navy
- Network-enabled capability, a UK military doctrine for using information systems

== Other ==
- Northeast Corridor, a rail line on the east coast of the United States
