= NARP =

NARP may refer to:

- The genetic disorder Neuropathy, ataxia, and retinitis pigmentosa
- The National Association of Railroad Passengers
- Nikolaev Aircraft Repair Plant - a Russian aircraft repair design and manufacture company
- Non-Athletic Regular Person (acronym)
- New Assault Rifle Platform - An Italian assault rifle

Narp or narp may refer to:

- Narp, a commune in France
- Narp, Iran, a village in Iran
- Narp, an obscure term for a musical tone between natural and sharp (a half sharp)
