= NSN =

NSN may refer to:

== Computing ==
- Network Service Name, for accessing a databases in Oracle Net Services
- Nokia Solutions and Networks, a subsidiary of Nokia Corporation

== Government, military and politics ==
- National Security Network, an American foreign-policy think tank
- NATO Stock Number, on military supply equipment
- New Schools Network, a British education reform group
- Native Sovereign Nation, in the United States
- National Socialist Network, an Australian neo-Nazi organisation

== Other uses ==
- Nelson Airport (New Zealand), by IATA code
- North Shore Navigators, a wooden-bat, collegiate summer baseball team based in Lynn, Massachusetts
- Never Shout Never, an American indie rock band
- NSN Cycling Team, a cycling team based in Spain

== See also ==
- Never Say Never (disambiguation)
