= NEMS =

NEMS may refer to:

- Gorilla Nems, an American rapper and internet personality from Coney Island, Brooklyn, New York
- Nanoelectromechanical systems
- National Energy Modeling System, a US government energy policy model
- NEMS AS, a Norwegian software and advisory company
- NEMS Enterprises (label), a record label based in Argentina
- NEMS Enterprises, Brian Epstein's musical act management company (North End Music Stores)
- Northeast Middle School (disambiguation)

== See also ==
- NEM (disambiguation)
