= NSA (disambiguation) =

NSA is the National Security Agency, a United States governmental agency.

NSA may also refer to:

== Organizations ==
- National Safety Associates, a Tennessee-based multilevel marketing company
- National Scrabble Association, a group of Scrabble players
- National Security Archive, a nongovernmental research institution at George Washington University
- National Sheep Association, a trade association in the UK for sheep farming
- National Sheriffs' Association, an organization of law enforcement specialists in the U.S.
- National Smokers Alliance, an organization that opposed anti-smoking legislation in the United States
- National Socialism Association, a Taiwanese neo-Nazi organisation
- National Softball Association, a U.S. support organization for players of the game
- National Speakers Association, a professional speakers' organization
- National Spiritual Assembly, an administrative body of the Bahá'í Faith
- National Sports Academy "Vasil Levski", Bulgaria
- National Sports Academy (Lake Placid, New York), a former preparatory school for winter-sport athletes
- National Student Association, an American student organization from the 1940s-'70s
- National Stuttering Association, U.S.
- New Saint Andrews College, in Idaho, U.S.
- New Syrian Army, a group of Syrian Arab Army defectors established during the Syrian Civil War
- Nichiren Shoshu America, an earlier name for the American division of present-day Soka Gakkai International
- Norwegian Shipowners' Association, the Norwegian shipowners organization in Norway
- North Sunflower Academy, a school in Sunflower County, Mississippi, U.S.

=== Government ===
- Supreme Administrative Court of Poland (Naczelny Sąd Administracyjny), the Polish court of last resort for administrative law disputes
- National Security Agency (Bahrain), a Bahrain governmental agency
- National Security Agency (Montenegro), a Montenegrin governmental agency
- National Security Authority, a Norwegian intelligence agency
- NATO Maintenance and Supply Agency, a NATO agency located in Capellen, Luxembourg
- NATO Standardization Agency, a NATO agency located in Brussels, Belgium

== Government position ==
- National Security Advisor (Canada)
- National Security Advisor (India)
- National Security Advisor (United States)
- National Security Adviser (United Kingdom)

== Other uses ==
- National scenic area, a conservation designation used in several countries
- National Supers Agency, a fictional organization of superheroes from the film The Incredibles
- National Sound Archive, a sound archive hosted by the British Library
- National Security Area, a designated airspace through which flight is discouraged in the US
- Naypyitaw State Academy, a state-run university in Myanmar
- Neue Schubert-Ausgabe, 20th-21st century edition of Franz Schubert's compositions
- New Series Adventures (Doctor Who), a series of novels based on the television programme Doctor Who
- New Statistical Account of Scotland, United Kingdom
- Notizie degli scavi di antichità, an Italian archeological peer-reviewed journal
- Next Step Agencies, bodies which perform public functions of government but modeled on the private sector
- Non-standard analysis (since 1966), a variant of calculus using infinitesimals
- No sulphite added, wines without added sulphites
- Non-state actor, a non-state entity which participates in international relations
- Not seasonally adjusted, for a statistical time series; See Seasonal adjustment
- Non-standalone, a mode in which a 5G cellular network can be deployed, involving the use of the 5G NR (New Radio) technology in combination with a 4G core network

== See also ==
- National Security Act (disambiguation)
- NASA (disambiguation)
- No Strings Attached (disambiguation)
