= NCTR =

NCTR may refer to:

- NOAA Center for Tsunami Research
- Non-Cooperative Target Recognition
- North Central Texas Railway, USA
- National Council on Teacher Retirement, USA
- National Center for Toxicological Research, USA
- National Centre for Truth and Reconciliation, Canada
- North Cyprus Turkish Republic
