= NSO =

NSO or Nso may refer to:

== Computing ==
- Nintendo Switch Online, online subscription service for the Nintendo Switch
- NSO Group (Niv, Shalev, Omri), an Israeli phone spyware company

== Government and military ==
- NATO Standardization Office
- Netherlands Space Office, now the Netherlands Space Agency
- National Statistics Office (Philippines)
- Nationale SIGINT Organisatie, the Netherlands
- National Socialist Order, the successor group of the Atomwaffen Division
- National Socialist Order of Nine Angels, the successor group of the National Socialist Order
- Nigerian Security Organization, security forces 1976-1985

== Languages ==
- Nso language, spoken in Cameroon (ISO 639:lns)
- Northern Sotho language, spoken in South Africa (ISO 639: nso)

== Transport ==
- Scone Airport (IATA airport code: NSO), Upper Hunter Valley, New South Wales, Australia
- Aerolíneas Sosa (ICAO airline code: NSO), Honduran airline
- Nashipur Road railway station (train station code: NSO), West Bengal, India

== Other uses ==
- Nso people, of Cameroon
- National Safeman's Organization, US
- National Solar Observatory, US
- National Symphony Orchestra (disambiguation), of several countries
- Non-qualified stock option, in finance
- Non-skating official, in roller derby
- Needy Streamer Overload, 2022 video game

== See also ==
- NS0 cell, a model cell line
- Country Code Names Supporting Organization (ccNSO)
