= Nau =

Nau, NAU or nau may refer to:

== Organizations ==
- Nau (clothing retailer), an outdoor apparel company
- Nanjing Agricultural University, China
- National American University
- National Anti-crisis Management (from Russian: Народное Антикризисное Управление), a shadow government created in Belarus in October 2020
- National Aviation University, Ukraine
- North American Union
- North American University
- Northern Arizona University

== People ==
- Claude Nau (died 1605), secretary of Mary, Queen of Scots
- François l'Olonnais (Jean-David Nau, c.1630–1669), French pirate active in the Caribbean during the 1660s
- Dana S. Nau (born 1951), computer scientist
- Sioeli Nau (1825–1895) also known as Joel Nau, Tongan Methodist minister
- François Nau (1864–1931), French Syriacist
- John L. Nau III, Texas businessman and historical preservationist

== Places ==
- Nau, Tajikistan, a town in Sughd Province of Tajikistan
- Spitamen District in Sughd Province of Tajikistan, formerly known as Nau District
- Nau (Danube), a river of Baden-Württemberg and Bavaria, Germany, tributary of the Danube
- Qila Nau, a village in Faridkot district, Punjab, India

== Music ==
- Nautilus Pompilius (band), sometimes abbreviated to Nau
- Nau, a Brazilian band fronted by Vange Leonel, active from 1985 to 1989
  - Nau (album), 1987 album by the aforementioned band

== Other uses ==
- Lepidium oleraceum, a plant endemic to New Zealand
- Carrack (Portuguese: Nau), a three- or four-masted sailing ship
- Nauru, license plate and UNDP country code
- Nauruan language ISO 639 code
- Napuka Airport (IATA code NAU) on the island nation of Napuka
- Bharatiya Nau Sena, the native name of the Indian Navy
- Bangladesh Nou-Bahini, the native name of the Bangladeshi Navy
