= NASP =

NASP may refer to:

In animation

- Nickelodeon Animated Shorts Program

In science and academia

- Nuclear autoantigenic sperm protein, a gene in the human genome
- National Association of School Psychologists

In military

- National Aerospace Plane, another name for the Rockwell X-30 experimental aircraft
- Naval Air Station Pensacola, a United States Navy base in Florida

In politics and government

- National Application Services Provider

In sports

- National Archery in the Schools Program, an archery program for schools in the United States (and also several other countries)

In automotive

- Naturally aspirated engine, an internal combustion engine that relies on atmospheric pressure for aspiration

In information technologies

- Nokia Asha Software Platform, a Nokia OS for low-end smartphones based on Smarterphone OS
- Neurodiverse Assistance & Support Platform, a Commodore Amiga software to assist users with cognitive disabilities
