= SHAPE Technical Centre =

STC's arms, a variation of the SHAPE insignia

Supreme Headquarters Allied Powers Europe (SHAPE) Technical Centre (STC) was the agency within the North Atlantic Treaty Organization's (NATO) SHAPE command that conducted air defence resesearch and development, in support of NATO funded procurements and interoperability. Formed in 1955 as the SHAPE Air Defence Technical Centre (SADTC), the agency was located in The Hague, Netherlands. In 1996, the STC was merged with NACISA to form the NATO Consultation, Command and Control Agency (NC3A).

== See also ==
- Supreme Headquarters Allied Powers Europe
- NC3A
- NACISA
- T. William Olle
