= NASP (gene) =

Protein-coding gene in humans

Identifiers
- Aliases: NASP, FLB7527, PRO1999, HMDRA1, nuclear autoantigenic sperm protein
- External IDs: OMIM: 603185; MGI: 1355328; GeneCards: NASP

Gene location (Human)
Chr.	Chromosome 1 (human)
Band	1p34.1	Start	45,583,846 bp
Band	1p34.1	End	45,618,904 bp

Gene location (Mouse)
Chr.	Chromosome 4 (mouse)
Band	4 D1|4 53.24 cM	Start	116,458,249 bp
Band	4 D1|4 53.24 cM	End	116,485,138 bp
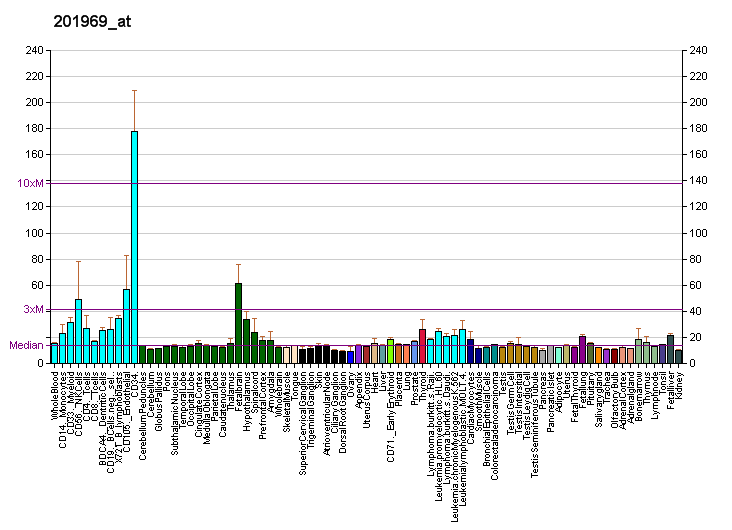

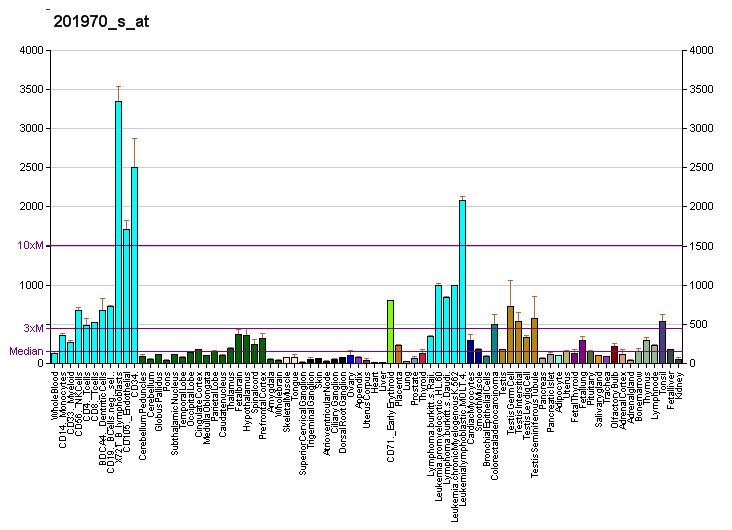
RNA expression pattern
Bgee	Human / Mouse (ortholog); Top expressed in: ventricular zone; embryo; ganglionic eminence; oocyte; right testis; left testis; secondary oocyte; sural nerve; right ovary; left ovary / Top expressed in: tail of embryo; genital tubercle; epiblast; spermatid; ventricular zone; somite; abdominal wall; spermatocyte; otic placode; primitive streak; More reference expression data
BioGPS	More reference expression data
Gene ontology
Molecular function	protein binding; histone binding; protein-containing complex binding
Cellular component	cytoplasm; nucleus; nucleoplasm; protein-containing complex
Biological process	protein transport; DNA replication-dependent chromatin assembly; DNA replication; nucleosome assembly; cell population proliferation; male gonad development; blastocyst development; histone exchange; response to testosterone; G1/S transition of mitotic cell cycle; cell cycle; CENP-A containing chromatin assembly
Sources:Amigo / QuickGO
Orthologs
Databases	NCBI: entry; OMA: entry
Species	Human	Mouse
Entrez	4678	50927
Ensembl	ENSG00000132780	ENSMUSG00000028693
UniProt	P49321	Q99MD9
RefSeq (mRNA)	NM_001195193; NM_002482; NM_152298; NM_172164	NM_001081475; NM_001284229; NM_016777
RefSeq (protein)	NP_001182122; NP_002473; NP_689511	NP_001074944; NP_001271158; NP_058057
Location (UCSC)	Chr 1: 45.58 – 45.62 Mb	Chr 4: 116.46 – 116.49 Mb
PubMed search
- Wikidata
View/Edit Human	View/Edit Mouse

Nuclear autoantigenic sperm protein is a protein that in humans is encoded by the NASP gene. Multiple isoforms are encoded by transcript variants of this gene.

== Function ==
This gene encodes a histone H1 binding protein that is involved in transporting histones into the nucleus of dividing cells. The somatic form is expressed in all mitotic cells, is localized to the nucleus, and is coupled to the cell cycle. The testicular form is expressed in embryonic tissues, tumor cells, and the testis. In male germ cells, this protein is localized to the cytoplasm of primary spermatocytes, the nucleus of spermatids, and the periacrosomal region of mature spermatozoa.
