= NB Global Monthly Income Fund =

- Company type: Public company
- Traded as: LSE: NBMI
- Industry: Investment
- Founded: 2011; 15 years ago
- Defunct: 2024
- Fate: Liquidated
- Headquarters: Saint Peter Port, Guernsey

NB Global Monthly Income Fund (LSE: NBMI) was a large British investment company dedicated to senior secured loans in large US and European companies. The company was listed on the London Stock Exchange. The chairman was Rupert Dorey, and it was managed by Neuberger Berman.

== History ==
The company was established as the NB Global Floating Rate Income Fund in March 2011. It changed its name to the NB Global Monthly Income Fund Limited on 9 September 2020. It announced that it would wind itself up and commenced a programme of compulsory redemptions in late 2022. Having distributed most of the assets, it then appointed Sophie Smith and Matthew Wright of Leonard Curtis as joint liquidators in July 2024.
