= NN =

NN, Nn, or nn may refer to:

== Arts and media ==
- NN (film), a 2014 Peruvian film
- Nintendo Network, a discontinued Nintendo service
- The Abominable Snowmen, a 1967 Doctor Who serial (production code NN)

== Businesses and organizations ==
- Nationale-Nederlanden, a Dutch insurance company commonly referred to as NN
- Netroots Nation, a political convention for American progressive activists
- Nevada Northern Railway (reporting mark NN)
- Norilsk Nickel, а metallurgical and mining company
- VIM Airlines (IATA airline designator NN)
- Nigerian Navy, part of the armed forces of Nigeria
- New Hope (Polish: Nowa Nadzieja), a Polish far right party

== Language ==
- ⟨nn⟩, a digraph; see List of Latin-script digraphs § N
- Ñ, a letter in Spanish, originally derived from the written "nn"
- Nynorsk, a Norwegian written language (ISO 639 alpha-1 code "nn"), as distinguished from Bokmål (code "no")

== People ==
- Camillo Almici, 18th-century Italian priest known by the pseudonym N.N.
- Nick Nurse, head coach of the NBA's Toronto Raptors
- Sergei Prokopovich, Russian economist known by the pseudonym N.N.

== Places ==
- NN postcode area, UK, for areas of Northamptonshire, England
- Newport News, a city in Virginia, United States
- Nizhniy Novgorod, a Russian city

== Science and technology ==
- Nearest neighbor (disambiguation), with several related uses in mathematics
- Net neutrality, the principle that Internet service providers should treat all data the same
- Neural network, a group of interconnected nerve cells or a machine-learning model inspired by one
- Neutronium, a hypothetical element with chemical symbol nn
- Normalnull, a German height reference system preceding Normalhöhennull (NHN)

== Other uses ==
- Double net lease, a type of lease used for commercial real estate
- Nomen nescio (Latin for "no name"), a person whose name is unknown
