= NRO =

NRO may stand for:

- National Reconciliation Ordinance, a Pakistani law
- National Reconnaissance Office, maintains United States reconnaissance satellites
- National Repertory Orchestra, in Colorado
- National Review Online, web version of the magazine National Review
- Nobeyama radio observatory, a division of the National Astronomical Observatory of Japan
- Non-resident Oriya, an informal term for people of Oriya ancestry
- Number Resource Organization, allocates IP numbers
- "Never Really Over", a song by Katy Perry, 2019
