= NED =

Ned or NED may refer to:

== People ==
- Ned (given name)
- Ned (Scottish), a slang term for a Scottish urban youth who engages in hooliganism

== Organisations ==
- National Endowment for Democracy, a U.S. non-profit organization
- NED University of Engineering and Technology, named after Nadirshaw Edulji Dinshaw, located in Karachi, Sindh, Pakistan

== In arts and entertainment ==
- Ned (film), a 2003 Australian film
- Neds (film), a 2010 British film
- N.E.D., a rock band consisted of medical doctors
- Ned, the title character of Ned's Declassified School Survival Guide, a Nickelodeon sitcom
- Ned, the title character of Ned's Newt, a 1990s Canadian animated series
- Ned, the title character of The Misfortune of Being Ned, a webseries

For a full list of fictional characters named Ned, see Ned (given name)#Fictional characters.

== In science, technology and medicine ==
- Named entity disambiguation, the task of determining the identity of entities mentioned in text
- Nano-emissive display, a type of flat panel display
- NASA/IPAC Extragalactic Database, a database of information on astronomical objects outside the Milky Way galaxy
- National Elevation Dataset, topographic data
- NED, National edeposit, an Australian online depository for legal deposit of electronic documents
- NED, acronym for "No evidence of disease", a term used by oncologists to describe the condition of a person with cancer who has been successfully treated and is in complete remission
- North east down axial system
- NED, acronym for "Nasal EPAP Dilator," a term used for a nasal device that combines nasal dilation with nasal EPAP (Expiratory Positive Air Pressure) to treat snoring and sleep disordered breathing

== In business ==
- New England Digital, a discontinued company producing music synthesizers
- A non-executive director of a company
- The Ned, a hotel at Midland Bank, Poultry

== Other uses ==
- Ned (snail) (d. 2026), New Zealand snail with a sinistral (left-spiraling) shell
- Ned, Tullyhunco, a townland in the parish of Killeshandra, barony of Tullyhunco, county of Cavan, Ireland
- Nederland, or the Netherlands, a country of which the IOC and FIFA abbreviation is NED
- "New Engine Desperado", a type of UK railfan, see Glossary of United Kingdom railway terms
- New English Dictionary, the original title of the Oxford English Dictionary
