= NZ (disambiguation) =

New Zealand (NZ) is a country in the southwest Pacific Ocean.

NZ or nz may also refer to:

== Transportation ==
- Air New Zealand (IATA airline designator from 1978)
- New Zealand National Airways Corporation (IATA airline designator 1947 to 1978)

== Other uses ==
- .nz, the internet country code top-level domain for New Zealand
- Novaya Zemlya, an Arctic archipelago of Russia
- Novozymes, a Danish biotech company, part of the Novo Group

== See also ==
- New Zealand (disambiguation)
