= NFT (disambiguation) =

NFT, or non-fungible token, is a unique digital identifier that is recorded on a blockchain.

NFT may also refer to:

- Nft (software), a command in the nftables subsystem of the Linux kernel
- NFT Ventures, Inc., a family trust established by an American computer businessman Ray Noorda
- National Film Theatre (now BFI Southbank), a leading repertory theatre in London
- Negombo Fisherman's Tamil, a Tamil dialect spoken in Negombo, Sri Lanka
- Neurofibrillary tangle, aggregates of hyperphosphorylated tau protein
- Not for Tourists, a series of guides to major cities
- Nutrient film technique, a hydroponic technique
- NFT, a timezone for the Norfolk Island external territory of Australia

== See also ==
- NTFS, a file system developed by Microsoft
- WP:NFT, a Wikipedia guideline
