= NCI =

NCI can stand for:

- Classical Nahuatl, ISO 639-3 language code nci
- National Cancer Institute, American medical research agency
- National Captioning Institute, American non-profit organization providing captioning for film and TV
- National Coastwatch Institution, UK voluntary coastwatch organisation
- National Computational Infrastructure National Facility (Australia), Australia’s national research computing service
- National College of Ireland, college in Dublin, Ireland
- Native Communications, Inc., Aboriginal public broadcasting service in Manitoba, Canada
- nCi, abbreviation for nanocurie, a unit of radioactivity
- NCI (TV channel), an Ivorian television channel
- Negative chemical ionization, chemical technique used in mass spectrometry
- Noarlunga Centre railway station, a railway station in Adelaide, Australia
- Noi con l'Italia ("Us with Italy"), an Italian political party
- North Coast Institute of TAFE, university system in New South Wales, Australia
- Non-controlling interest (Minority interest), in accounting, minority ownership in a subsidiary corporation
- Nuclear Cities Initiative
