= NLB =

NLB may refer to:

- Nanotechnology Law & Business, a journal devoted to the legal, business, and policy aspects of nanotechnology
- National Labor Board (1933–1934), a former agency of the US government
- National League B, former name of the Swiss League, the second highest ice hockey league in Switzerland
- National Library Board of Singapore
- National Library for the Blind of the United Kingdom
- Nationalliga B, former name of the Swiss Challenge League, the second highest football league in Switzerland
- Negro league baseball (1885—1960), American baseball leagues with African-American players
- Network load balancing, a technique for dividing computer network traffic among multiple network connections
- New Lantao Bus, a bus service operator on Lantau Island, Hong Kong
- New Left Books, former name of Verso Books, the book publishing arm of the New Left Review
- NLB League, former name (2006—2011) of the ABA League (Adriatic League), a basketball league of teams from Bosnia and Herzegovina, Croatia, Montenegro, Serbia, and Slovenia
- Norbert Leo Butz (born 1967), American musical theater actor
- Northern Lighthouse Board, organisation responsible for marine navigation aids in Scotland and the Isle of Man
- Nova Ljubljanska banka, the largest bank in Slovenia
