= NNSA =

NNSA may refer to

- National Nuclear Safety Administration, People's Republic of China
- National Nuclear Security Administration, United States of America
