= NEP =

NEP or Nep may refer to:

== Organizations ==
- NEP Group, Inc., a US-based television production company
- NHK Enterprises, a commercial subsidiary of Japanese public broadcaster NHK
- National Election Pool, a consortium of US news organizations
- Network equipment provider

== Economics ==
- National Energy Program, in Canada
- New Economic Policy, in the Soviet Union between 1921 and 1928
- Malaysian New Economic Policy

== Science ==
- N-Ethylpentedrone, a stimulant drug
- Neprilysin, or neutral endopeptidase, a protein
- Net ecosystem production, a measure of carbon in ecosystems
- Noise-equivalent power, of a photodetector

== Other uses ==
- N.E.P., a rock band from St. Petersburg, Russia
- Nepal, FIFA and IOC code NEP
- Nepr, a Norse god
- Needle exchange programme
- New Economic Party, an Israeli political party
- New England Patriots, an American football team
- Northeast Passage, a polar waterway
- National Education Policy 2020, of India
- North European Plain, a geographical region of Europe
