= NER =

NER may refer to:

- New European Recordings, a record label
- ISO 3166-1 three letter code for Niger
- North-East India, officially known as the North Eastern Region (NER)
- Nucleotide excision repair, a DNA repair mechanism
- Network Effectiveness Ratio, KPI in telecommunications
- New England Review, American literary magazine
- New England Revolution, American soccer team
- Nemzeti Együttműködés Rendszere (NER, English: System of National Cooperation), the network of political and cultural institutions and private corporations closely aligned with Prime Minister Viktor Orbán or with the national-conservative Fidesz party in Hungary
- Named-entity recognition, a subtask of information extraction in computational linguistics

== Rail transport ==
- Northeast Regional, an Amtrak route in northeastern United States
- North Eastern Railway (India)
- North Eastern Railway (United Kingdom) (1854–1922)
- Northern and Eastern Railway (N&ER), an early British rail company (1840–1902)

== Ner ==
- Ner, a river in Poland
- Ner, Łódź Voivodeship, a village in central Poland
- Ner (Bible), a person mentioned in the Bible
