= NEIC =

The abbreviation NEIC may refer to:

- Nash equilibrium incentive compatibility, see Myerson–Satterthwaite theorem § Requirements
- National Earthquake Information Center
- Navy Expeditionary Intelligence Command, a component of Navy Expeditionary Combat Command
- Nigerian National Economic Intelligence Committee, see Garba Ali Mohammed
- Nordic e-Infrastructure Collaboration, see Advanced Resource Connector § Nordic DataGrid Facility and NeIC
- Northeast Illinois Council, an administrative district of the Boy Scouts of America
- Northeast Iowa Conference
