= NF =

NF may refer to:

== Computing and technology ==
- .nf, the internet country code top-level domain for Norfolk Island
- NF file format, used by TRUMPF machines
- Noise figure, in radio and radar signal processing
- Normal forms, criteria for determining a table's degree of vulnerability to logical inconsistencies and anomalies

== Companies and organizations ==
- Air Vanuatu (IATA airline designator NF), the national airline of Vanuatu
- National Front (disambiguation), the name of many political parties
- N.F.-Board, a defunct international football association
- Nuestra Familia, a Mexican American criminal organization
- Northwest Front, an American white nationalist group founded by Harold Covington
- Netflix, a US-based worldwide entertainment media provider
- NF Records, a record label by Japanese rock band Sakanaction

=== Political groups ===
- National Forum (Croatia), a political party in Croatia
- National Front (UK), a British Neo-fascist political party.
- Nationalist Front (Germany), a German Neo-Nazi group.
- Nationalist Front (United States), an American far-right coalition of groups.

== Biology and medicine ==
- Neurofibromatosis, a medical disorder in which nerve tissues grow tumors
- Necrotizing fasciitis, a type of bacterial infection
- Nuclear factor e.g.
  - Nuclear factor I
  - Hepatocyte nuclear factors (HNF)
- National Formulary, a manual of medicines

== Music ==
- NF (rapper), American hip hop musician
  - NF (EP), 2014

== Places ==
- Newfoundland and Labrador, a Canadian province, former postal code NF
- Norfolk Island, part of the Commonwealth of Australia

== Other uses ==
- New Foundations, a theory in mathematical logic
- Nitrogen monofluoride, a chemical compound
- Nod factor, a kind of molecule produced by soil bacteria
- NF mark, certification mark by the French AFNOR standards organization
- Night Fighter, a fighter aircraft adapted for use in times of bad visibility
- No Funds, used on bank statements, sometimes written as N/F.

== See also ==
- NF-κB, a protein complex that controls transcription of DNA, cytokine production and cell survival
