= Never Say Never =

Never Say Never may refer to:

== Music ==
- Never Say Never Festival, an annual music festival in Texas, U.S.

=== Albums ===
- Never Say Never (Alias album), 2009
- Never Say Never (Brandy album), 1998
- Never Say Never (Ian McLagan album), 2008
- Never Say Never (Kim Wilde album), 2006
- Never Say Never (Melba Moore album), 1983
- Never Say Never (Zerobaseone album), 2025
- Never Say Never: The First 20 Years, a 2001 box set by The Choir
- Never Say Never: The Remixes, a 2011 album by Justin Bieber
- Never Say Never (EP), a 1982 EP by Romeo Void

=== Songs ===
- "Never Say Never" (Armin van Buuren song), 2009
- "Never Say Never" (Basement Jaxx song), 2014
- "Never Say Never" (Brandy song), 1998
- "Never Say Never" (Cole Swindell and Lainey Wilson song), 2021
- "Never Say Never" (Justin Bieber song), 2010
- "Never Say Never" (Romeo Void song), 1982, covered by Queens of the Stone Age
- "Never Say Never" (T. Graham Brown song), 1989
- "Never Say Never" (The Fray song), 2009
- "Never Say Never" (Vandalism song), 2006
- "Never Say Never", a musical number from the 1986 animated film, An American Tail
- "Never Say Never", the opening theme of the 2013 anime Danganronpa: The Animation
- "Never Say Never", by Jeffrey Ngai, 2023
- "Never Say Never", by Jennifer Rush from the self-titled album, 1992
- "Never Say Never", by Lisette Melendez from Together Forever, 1991
- "Never Say Never", by Overkill from Under the Influence
- "Never Say Never", by Styx from Cornerstone, 1979
- "Never Say Never", by Triumph from Surveillance, 1987
- "Never Say Never", by that dog. from Retreat from the Sun, 1997
- "Never Say Never", by Thundamentals from Everyone We Know, 2017
- "Never Say Never", by Vixen from Tangerine, 1998
- "Never Say Never", by KMFDM from Blitz, 2009
- "Never Say Never", by Mr Big from Lean Into It, 1991
- "All Stand Up (Never Say Never)", by Status Quo from Heavy Traffic
- "Never Say Never", by Olivia Addams, 2022
- "Never Say Never", by Sick Individuals, 2017

== Film ==
- Justin Bieber: Never Say Never, 2011 documentary film
- Never Say Never, a 1994 pornographic film by Harold Lime
- Never Say Never (2023 film), a Chinese mixed martial arts sports drama film

== Other uses ==
- MLW Never Say Never, a Major League Wrestling event

== See also ==
- Never Say Never Again, a 1983 James Bond film
