= NYO =

NYO may refer to:

- NYO, the IATA airport code the Stockholm Skavsta Airport in Sweden
- NYO, the railway station code the Nayagaon railway station in India
- NYO, the National Youth Orchestra of Canada
- NYO, the National Youth Orchestra of China
- NYO, the National Youth Orchestra of the United States of America
- NYO, the National Youth Orchestra of Great Britain
- NYO, the New Zealand NZSO National Youth Orchestra

== See also ==
- "Nyo" is one of the Japanese onomatopoeias meaning "Meow". e.g. in the anime Di Gi Charat
