= NR =

NR, Nr or nr may refer to:

== Arts and media ==
- National Review, an American political magazine
- Newsround, a British news programme for children
- Nollywood Reinvented, a Nigerian cinematic review website
- Numerical Recipes, a series of books on numerical computation
- Not Rated, referring to a work without a content rating in North America

== Places ==
- NR postcode area, UK, for the area surrounding Norwich, England
- Nauru (ISO 3166-1 country code)
  - .nr, the country code top-level domain for Nauru
- North Riding of Yorkshire, England
- Northern Rhodesia
- New Rockford, North Dakota, US

== Businesses and organizations ==
=== Military bodies ===
- National Resources Division, the domestic division of the United States Central Intelligence Agency
- Naval Reserve (disambiguation), various bodies
- Naval Reactors, the governing body of the United States Navy Nuclear Power Program

=== Rail bodies in Great Britain ===
- National Rail, a generic term for passenger services
- Network Rail, the state-owned track owner (2002–)
- Northern Rail, a train operating company (2004–2016)
- Northern Railway (India)

=== Other businesses and organizations ===
- Northern Rock, a defunct British bank (1965–2012)
- Norwegian Computing Center (NR, in Norwegian: Norsk Regnesentral)
- Networked Robotics Corporation
- New Right (Netherlands), a former Dutch political party

== Language ==
- Nr., a numero sign in some languages
- Southern Ndebele language, a Bantu language spoken in South Africa (ISO 639-1 code: NR)

== Science and technology ==
=== Biochemistry ===
- Nuclear receptor, a class of receptor proteins in the cell
- Nicotinamide riboside, a form of Vitamin B3
- Reactive nitrogen (Nr)

=== Computing and telecommunications ===
- .nr, the top-level domain for Nauru
- New Radio, a fifth generation (5G) wireless technology
- Noise reduction, the process of removing noise from a signal
- Numerical Recipes, a series of books on numerical computation

=== Other uses in science and technology ===
- Nanorod, in nanotechnology and materials science
- Non-redundant sequence clustering, in genetics and bioinformatics
- NR Vulpeculae, a red supergiant star

== Other uses ==
- NR class, an Australian diesel locomotive
- Non Resident Nepali (NRN)
