= NMD =

NMD may refer to:

- Adidas NMD, a line of running shoes
- Neuronal migration disorder, a heterogenous group of disorders that may share the same etiopathological mechanism
- NMD, post-nominals partially allowed in North America for doctors of naturopathy
- Nonsense mediated decay, a surveillance pathway that exists in all eukaryotes
- Norsk Medisinaldepot, a pharmaceutics and healthcare products wholesaler
- United States national missile defense, nationwide antimissile program under development since the 1990s
