= NW =

NW may refer to:

== Arts and entertainment ==
- NW (novel), by Zadie Smith
- Nat Wolff, a singer and actor
- New wave music, a genre
- New Weekly, an Australian celebrity magazine
- Nintendo Wii, a video game console
- Northern Whig, Irish newspaper

== Geography ==
- Northwest (disambiguation), multiple articles
- NW postcode area, northwest London, UK
- Nidwalden, a canton of Switzerland
- North Rhine-Westphalia, the most populous state of Germany
- North West (South African province)

== Technology ==
- Nanowire, a nanostructure with a diameter on the order of a nanometer
- NetWare, in file and protocol names of the Novell NetWare family
- Nuclear warfare, the use of nuclear weapons in war
- An ISO-specified vacuum flange fitting (code NW)

== Other uses ==
- Nahdlatul Wathan, an Indonesian Islamic organization
- No worries, an expression
- Norfolk and Western Railroad, a U.S. class I railroad
- North Western Reporter, a US case law report series
- Northwest Airlines (former IATA airline code NW)
- The Napoleonic Wars
