= NAEC =

NAEC may refer to:

- Lakehurst Maxfield Field, an American military base in Ocean County, New Jersey, United States, once known as NAEC Airport
- National Aboriginal Education Committee, an Australian organisation
- National Association of Elevator Contractors, an American labor union initially formed in 1950 by a group of Montgomery Elevator distributors
- National Aviation Education Center, an aviation museum in Dallas, Texas, United States
- Nigeria Atomic Energy Commission, an entity within the federal government of Nigeria
- Stoneleigh Park, a business park near Stoneleigh, Warwickshire, England, home to a National Agricultural and Exhibition Centre
