= NLF =

NLF may stand for:

- National Liberation Front, name used by various independence groups, paramilitary organizations, and political parties in different countries
  - National Liberation Front of Yemen, which eventually became the main force behind the creation of the Yemeni Socialist Party
  - Viet Cong, officially the National Liberation Front for South Vietnam, which existed from 1960 to 1977
- National Labour Federation (Pakistan)
- National Liberal Federation, organization of the British Liberal Party, 1877–1936
- National Labor Federation in Eretz-Israel, a national trade union center in Israel
- Natural laminar flow, a strategy in airfoil design
- New Legislative Framework, legislation aiming to improve the internal market of the European Union
- New Life Fellowship Church (Vietnam)
- Non-lactose fermenter, a type of bacterium that grows in Sorbitol-MacConkey agar
- Nuclear Liabilities Fund, a UK body funding nuclear decommissioning
- Darnley Island Airport, IATA airport code "NLF"
