= NK =

NK may refer to:

== Businesses ==
- Imerys, a French mining multinational (Euronext ticker:NK)
- Nordiska Kompaniet, a Swedish department store
- Northrup-King Seed Company, U.S.
- Spirit Airlines, U.S. (IATA:NK)
- NK.pl, a Polish social network (2006–2021)

== Organisations ==
- Neturei Karta, a group of anti-zionist orthodox Jews
- Nippon Kaiji Kyokai, a ship classification society
- NK (nogomentni klub), a name suffix for Croatian and Slovenian football clubs

== Places ==
- North Korea, a country in Asia
- Nagorno-Karabakh Republic, a de facto state (1991–2023)
- Nikšić, Montenegro (license plate:NK)
- North Kingstown, Rhode Island, U.S.
  - North Kingstown High School
- Nasik Road railway station (station code: NK), Maharashtra, India

== Other uses ==
- NK (singer), a Ukrainian singer
- Naik (military rank), in certain South Asian armies
- Natural killer cell, in medicine
- Neue Kerze ('new candle'; nk), original name for the photometric unit the candela
- Norwegian krone, a currency
- Normal Country (Polish: Normalny Kraj, NK), a Polish right-wing political party
