= NAA =

NAA or Naa may refer to:

== People ==
- Naa Ashorkor (born 1988), Ghanaian actress and radio/ TV broadcaster
- Naa Govindasamy (1946–1999), Singaporean Tamil-language writer and computer font developer
- Naa Someswara, Indian science writer and TV presenter

== Businesses and organizations ==
=== Airports and aviation ===
- Narita International Airport Corporation, Japan
- Narrabri Airport (IATA code NAA), New South Wales, Australia
- National Aeronautic Association, US
- National Aviation Academy, training school in the US
- National aviation authority or civil aviation authority, in each country
- North American Airlines, founded 1989, ceased operations 2014
- North American Aviation, major US aerospace manufacturer from 1928 to 1967
- Norwegian Air Argentina, an Argentinian airline

=== In other fields ===
- National Academy of Arbitrators, US and Canada
- National Academy of Art, Bulgaria
- National Anthropological Archives of the Smithsonian Institution, US
- National Archives of Australia
- National Assessment Agency, in the UK Department for Education and Skills
- National Association of Actors, a Mexican television and motion picture performers union
- National Auctioneers Association, US
- Nederlands Audiovisueel Archief, former name of the Nederlands Instituut voor Beeld en Geluid (Netherlands Institute for Sound and Vision), an audiovisual archive in the Hilversum, Netherlands
- Negro American Association, US baseball minor Negro league
- Newspaper Association of America, a trade association
- Nigerian Accounting Association, an association of academics in Nigeria
- North American Arms, an arms company

== In science and technology ==
- 1-Naphthaleneacetic acid, a synthetic auxin (organic compound and plant hormone)
- N-Acetylaspartic acid, a neurochemical often imaged in magnetic resonance spectroscopy
- Neutron activation analysis, a nuclear process used for determining the concentrations of elements in materials
- Nicotinamide, also called niacinamide, the amide of nicotinic acid
- No abstract available bias, an academic tendency to preferentially cite journal articles that have an abstract available online
- Nucleic acid amplification, a molecular biology technique for replicating segments of DNA
- Network Address Authority, iSCSI terminology

== Other uses ==
- National Arabic Alphabets, in the Unicode standard
- VLF Transmitter Cutler (call-sign NAA), a radio station in Cutler, Maine, operated by the United States Navy
- NAA (Virginia) a Navy radio facility located in Arlington, Virginia from 1913 to 1941
