= NACC =

NACC may refer to:

- National Anti-Corruption Commission (Australia)
- National Anti-Corruption Commission (Thailand)
- National Anti-Corruption Commission (Saudi Arabia)
- National assessment on climate change, a multidisciplinary effort to study and portray the potential effects of human-induced global warming on the United States
- National Association for Colitis and Crohn's Disease (UK)
- National Association of Catholic Chaplains, a professional association for certified chaplains and clinical pastoral educators
- National Authority for Child Care, a quasi-judicial government agency regulating adoption and foster homes
- National Automobile Chamber of Commerce, an early name for the Automobile Manufacturers Association
- North American Christian Convention, an annual meeting of ministers and other active leaders in the Independent Christian Churches/Churches of Christ
- North American Classification Committee, see American Ornithological Society § Committees
- North American College and Community Radio Chart, a weekly top 200 radio chart tracking college radio in North America
- North American Competitiveness Council, an official tri-national working group of the Security and Prosperity Partnership of North America
- North Atlantic Cooperation Council, the precursor to the Euro-Atlantic Partnership Council
- Northeast Alabama Community College, a two-year community college on the border of Jackson and DeKalb Counties
- Northern Arts and Cultural Centre, a performing arts venue in Yellowknife, Northwest Territories
- Northern Athletics Collegiate Conference, a conference competing in NCAA Division III in the Upper Midwest
- Nucleus accumbens (NAcc), a brain structure
