= NX =

NX may refer to:

== Arts and entertainment ==
- Northern Exposure, a 1990s TV show turned cable

== Science and technology ==
=== Computing ===
- NX bit, a security-related computer technology for x86 and x64 processors
- NX technology, a computer program that handles remote X Window System connections
- Siemens NX, a CAx software product from Siemens PLM Software
- DRS/NX, a port of UNIX System V for ICL DRS and later servers
- EDIUS NX, a video editing and capture card sold by Grass Valley
- NXDOMAIN, "nonexistent domain", an error response to a DNS query, sometimes used for DNS hijacking

=== Other uses in science and technology ===
- NX, the pre-release codename of the Nintendo Switch video game console
- Nox (unit) (nx), a unit of illuminance, equal to 1/1000 lux
- Samsung NX series, a series of digital cameras

== Transport ==
- NX Bridge, over the Passaic River in New Jersey
- Lexus NX, a crossover vehicle
- Nissan NX, and Nissan Pulsar NX, a range of subcompact coupes offered by Nissan from the 1980s to 1993
- Air Macau (IATA: NX)
- A 1967-1968 super-express line; see N (New York City Subway service)

== Other uses ==
- Net exports, in economics
- Ningxia, an autonomous region in China (Guobiao abbreviation NX)
- NX Newcastle, a music venue in Newcastle upon Tyne, England
- Nintendo Switch, a video game console developed by Nintendo under the "NX" codename
