= NKA =

NKA may refer to:

- "Now known as"
- "No known allergies" in medical jargon
- Initialism for North Korean Army, also known as the Korean People's Army
- Na^{+}/K^{+}-ATPase, an enzyme located in the plasma membrane in all animals
- Karate Canada, previously the "National Karate Association" of Canada
- New Kosovo Alliance, a political party
- Neurokinin A, a neurologically active peptide that seems to be involved in reactions to pain and the inflammatory responses
- Youth of Communist Liberation or nKA, a political party in Greece
