= NAF =

NAF or Naf may refer to:

== Organizations ==
- NAF (non-profit organization), a U.S. education non-profit organization formerly known as National Academy Foundation
- National Abortion Federation, a U.S. organization of abortion providers
- National Academies Forum, the peak body for the four learned academies in Australia
- Netherland-America Foundation, an organization which supports exchange between the United States and The Netherlands
- New America Foundation a Washington, DC–based think tank
- Norwegian Automobile Federation, an association of car owners
- Norwegian Employers' Confederation
- Norwegian Union of General Workers
- National Arbitration Forum, a U.S. arbitration and mediation firm
- Nordisk Andels Forbund ("Nordic Coöp Federation"), the predecessor to Coop Norden

== Defense ==
- Nigerian Air Force
- NATO Architecture Framework, an architecture framework used by NATO
- Naval Air Facility, a lower-level naval air station in the United States Navy
- Naval Aircraft Factory, operated in Philadelphia from 1918 to 1945
- Numbered Air Force in the United States Air Force
- United Armed Forces of Novorossiya, Eastern Ukrainian pro-Russian separatists fighting the Ukrainian government for independence

== Science and mathematics ==
- Negation as failure, logic in which a statement that cannot be shown to be true is considered false rather than unknown
- Non-adjacent form, a signed-digit representation of numbers in mathematics and cryptography
- Sodium fluoride, a chemical compound whose formula is NaF
- Neutrophil-activating factor

== Other uses ==
- National Academy Foundation School, a public high school located in Baltimore, Maryland
- Native American flute, an end-blown flute from North America
- North Anatolian Fault, Turkey
- Naf River, a river between Bangladesh and Myanmar
- Nice As Fuck, an American indie rock band
- Nuffle Amorical Football, fictional governing body for the fantasy football game Blood Bowl
- Netherlands Antillean guilder, often shortened to NAf
