= National Institute on Retirement Security =

- Founded: 2007
- Founder: The Council of Institutional Investors, The National Association of State Retirement Administrators, The National Council on Teacher Retirement
- Type: Research and education
- Location: Washington, D.C., United States
- Website: www.nirsonline.org

The National Institute on Retirement Security (NIRS) is a nonpartisan non-profit research institute based in Washington, D.C., United States, which focuses on policymaking in the area of retirement security. NIRS develops and distributes research reports on a wide range of retirement issues. The research focuses on retirement security, with an emphasis on the role and value of the defined benefit pension plan (DB) and on innovative policies and strategies in the retirement arena. NIRS also holds an annual retirement policy conference in Washington, D.C. that focuses on retirement policy solutions.

== History and mission ==
NIRS was established in early 2007, with Beth Almeida as the first executive director.
