= NPL =

NPL may refer to:

== Sport ==
- National Pickleball League of Champions Pros, an American professional pickleball league for senior players
- National Pickleball League Australia, an Australian professional pickleball league
- National Pool League, a defunct American pool league
- Nepal Premier League, a professional cricket league

=== Football ===
- Namibia Premier League, the defunct top tier of football in Namibia
- National Premier League, the top tier of football in Jamaica
- National Premier Leagues, the second tier of men's football in Australia
  - National Premier Leagues Women's, the second tier of women's football in Australia
- Nigerian Premier League, the top tier of football in Nigeria
- Northern Premier League, at the seventh and eighth tier of football in England
- Northern Premier League (Tasmania), a third-tier football league in Australia covering northern Tasmania
- Norwegian Premier League, the top tier of football in Norway

== Computing ==
- Netscape Public License, a free software license
- New programming language, the original name of PL/I by IBM in 1964
- Nonprocedural language, by T.D. Truitt et al. in 1980
- NPL programming language, a functional programming language by Rod Burstall and John Darlington in 1977
- NORD Programming Language, an internal systems language used at Norsk Data
- NPL network, a computer network from 1967 until 1986, a precursor to the internet

== Organizations ==
- National Party of Liberia
- National Puzzlers' League, the oldest puzzlers' organization in the world
- Nonpartisan League, an American socialist political organization
- National Physical Laboratory (United Kingdom)
- National Physical Laboratory of India
- New Paradise Laboratories, an experimental theater ensemble in Pennsylvania, USA

== Places ==
- Nepal (ISO 3166-1 alpha-3 code)
- New Plymouth Airport (IATA code), New Zealand

== Other uses ==
- National Priorities List, an EPA list of hazardous waste sites in the United States
- Nauru Pacific Line, the national shipping line of the Republic of Nauru
- Non-Patent Literature, used before the United States Patent and Trademark Office
- Non-performing loan, a loan close to, or in default
- Novgorod First Chronicle (Novgorodskaia pervaia letopis’), the oldest extant Rus' chronicle of the Novgorod Republic
- Nuclear pumped laser, a laser pumped with the energy of fission fragments

== See also ==
- NPL SA, the National Premier Leagues South Australia
