= NRU =

NRU may refer to:

- Natural rate of unemployment
- National Reform Union (1864–1867), a political movements in the United Kingdom
- National Republic of Ukraine
- People's Movement of Ukraine (Народний Рух України, Narodnyi Rukh Ukrajiny)
- National Research Universal reactor
- Nauru, an island country (ISO 3166-1 alpha-3 code: NRU)
- Neighbourhood Renewal Unit, part of the Department for Communities and Local Government in the United Kingdom
- Nitrogen rejection unit
- Northeast Rugby Union
- Not recently used, a page replacement algorithm

== See also ==
- Nru Nsukka, a town
