= Nau (Danube) =

River in Germany

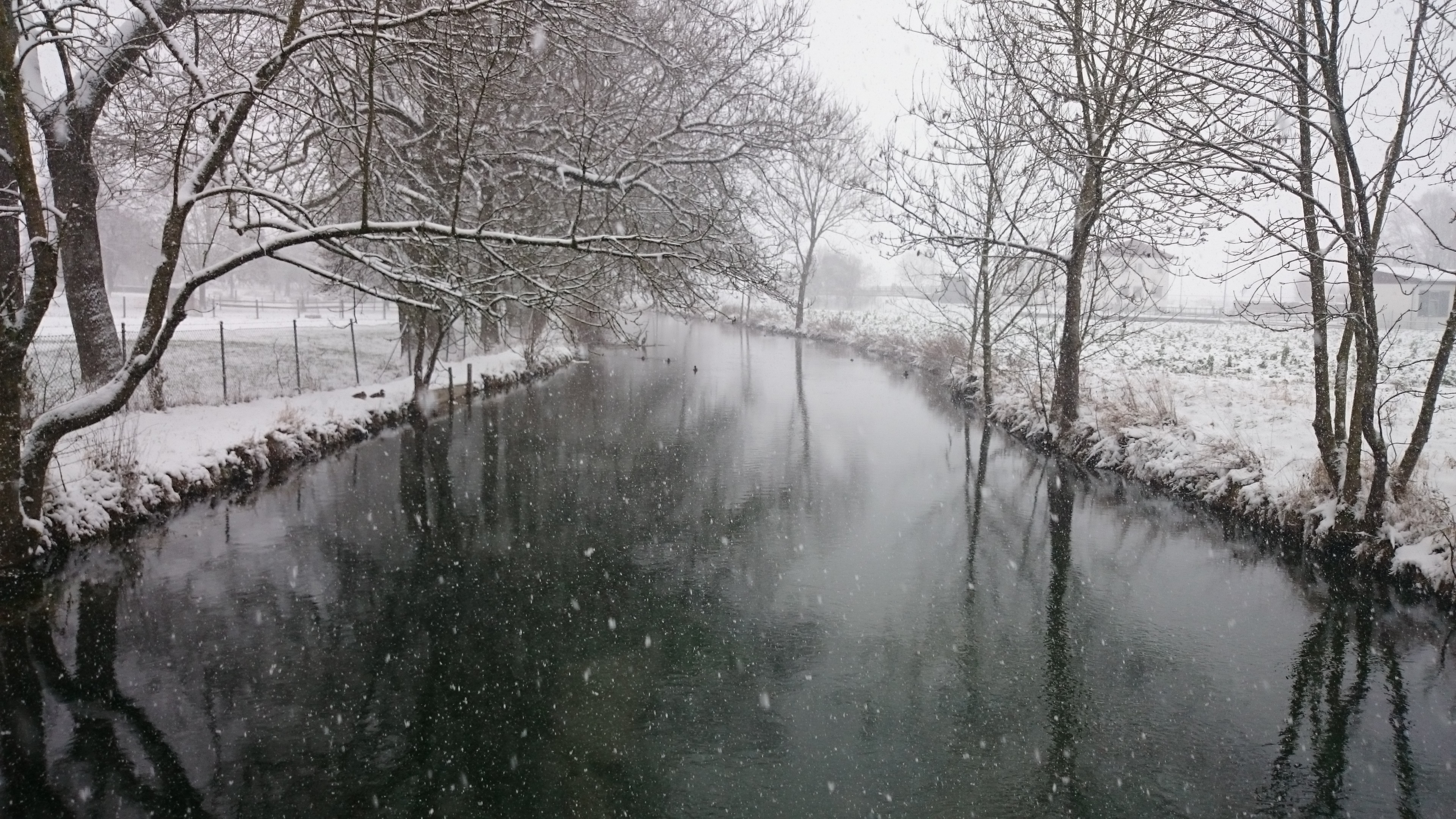
- The Nau east of Langenau

Location
- Country: Germany
- States: Baden-Württemberg and Bavaria

Physical characteristics
- Mouth
  - location: Danube
  - coordinates: 48.4636°N 10.2764°E
- Length: 21.1 km (13.1 mi)

Basin features
- Progression: Danube→ Black Sea

Nau is a river of Baden-Württemberg and Bavaria, Germany. It is a left tributary of the Danube near Günzburg.

== See also ==
- List of rivers of Baden-Württemberg
- List of rivers of Bavaria
