= Naas (disambiguation) =

Naas is a town in eastern Ireland.

Naas or NAAS may also refer to:

== People ==
- Naas Botha (born 1958), South African rugby player
- Roberta Naas (born 1958), American writer about timepieces
- Stefan Naas (born 1973), German politician

== Places ==
- Naas, Styria, a municipality in Styria, Austria
- Naas (valley), a valley in south-eastern Australia
- Nääs Castle, near Gothenburg, Sweden, a 17th-century mansion
- Naas River, river in Australia's Murray–Darling basin

== Other ==
- National Assembly Party (NAAS), a political party in Saudi Arabia
- Network as a service (NaaS), a business model for telecommunications operators
