= NPD =

NPD may refer to:

== Companies ==
- NPD Group, an American market research company
- NPD (petrol), a New Zealand fuel retailer

== Political parties ==
- New Democratic Party of Canada (Nouveau Parti Démocratique)
- The Homeland, formerly known as the National Democratic Party of Germany, a far-right party (Nationaldemokratische Partei Deutschlands)
- National Democratic Party of Germany (2023), a far-right party that split from The Homeland (Nationaldemokratische Partei Deutschlands)
- National Party of Germany, a former minor party (Nationale Partei Deutschlands)
- New Party Daichi, Japan
- New Palangdharma Party, Thailand

== Places ==
- New Pudsey railway station, England (National Rail code: NPD)
- Nawapara Road railway station, India (Indian Railways code: NPD)

== Science ==
- Narcissistic personality disorder
- Nitrogen–phosphorus detector, in chromatography
- Non-parental ditype, in tetrad genetic analysis
- Nuclear Power Demonstration, a reactor in Canada
- Nuclear Protein Database

== Other uses ==
- New product development, the complete process of bringing a new product to market
- Newark Police Division, United States
