= ND =

ND may refer to:

== Arts and media ==
- nD, a fictional alien species in Invasion: Earth (TV series)
- Nancy Drew, a fictional teenage sleuth in various media
- Naughty Dog, an American video game developer
- Notitia Dignitatum, a late Roman administrative codex
- Nuclear Dawn, a 2011 video game (once a Half-Life 2 mod)

== Businesses ==
- Nextdoor, a hyperlocal social networking service for neighborhoods
- NetDocuments, a British document management company
- Norsk Data, a defunct Norwegian computer manufacturer
- Neues Deutschland, or nd, a German daily newspaper
- Nederlands Dagblad, or ND, a Dutch daily newspaper

== Language ==
- Nd (digraph), a digraph present in many African languages
- Northern Ndebele language, of Botswana and Zimbabwe (ISO 639-1:nd)

== Places ==
- North Dakota, a state of the United States
- New Delhi, India's capital city
- Notre Dame (disambiguation), a number of churches and colleges
- Nguyen dynasty, unified Vietnamese empire (1802–1884)

== Politics ==
- National Democracy (Poland), a political movement 1886–1947
- National Democrats (Sweden), a far-right party 2001–2014
- New Dawn (Algeria), a nationalist party formed in 2012
- New Democracy (Canada), an economic reform party 1939–1940
- New Democracy (Greece), a center-right party formed in 1974
- New Democracy (North Macedonia), a conservative ethnic Albanian party formed in 2008
- New Democrats (France), a left-wing party 2020–2022
- Nuclear disarmament, the dismantlement and proposed dismantling of nuclear weapons

== Science and technology ==
=== Mathematics ===
- nd (elliptic function), one of Jacobi's elliptic functions

=== Medicine ===
- NADH dehydrogenase, an enzyme
- Non-distended, an abdominal distension clinical examination value
- Naturopathic Doctor, a degree in naturopathic medicine
- Notifiable disease, any disease that is required by law to be reported to government authorities

=== Physics ===
- ND Experiment, a particle physics experiment in Novosibirsk, Russia
- n_{D}, the refractive index of a medium at a wavelength of 589.8 nm

=== Other uses in science and technology ===
- Neighbor Discovery, an Internet protocol
- Neodymium, symbol Nd, a chemical element
- Neutral density filter, a type of filter used in photography
- Contax N Digital, a digital camera
- ND for nominal diameter in piping
- ND MX-5 Miata, the fourth generation of the Mazda MX-5

== Weapons and military ==
- United States Navy Diver, an occupational rating
- Negligent discharge, a careless use of a firearm
- Norrland Dragoon Regiment, of the Swedish Army
- Nuclear disarmament, the proposed dismantling of nuclear weapons

== Other uses ==
- National Diploma (Ireland), an academic qualification in the Republic of Ireland
- New Dawn (disambiguation), with various meanings
- Neurodiversity, variation in cognition and sociability (per the social model of disability)
- n.d. for "no date", an abbreviation used in APA-style and other styles of bibliographic citations
- The NoDerivatives condition of Creative Commons licences
- in the International Code of Signals, denotes a tsunami warning
