= NPH =

NPH may refer to:

== Medicine ==
- NPH insulin, an intermediate-acting insulin
- National Pediatric Hospital, Cambodia, a government-run pediatric hospital in Phnom Penh
- Normal pressure hydrocephalus, a condition of excessive fluid in the brain

== Other ==
- Fujicolor Pro (previously NPH 400), a line of professional color negative films
- National Party of Honduras, a centre-right conservative political party in Honduras
- Neil Patrick Harris, American actor, singer, director and magician
- Negative pH (band), an Electronic music band
- New Phyrexia (expansion code: NPH), a Magic: the Gathering expansion set
- North Providence High School, a public high school in North Providence, Rhode Island
- Northeast Party House, an Australian electronic dance band
- Northwestern Publishing House, the official publishing house for the Wisconsin Evangelical Lutheran Synod
- Nuestros Pequeños Hermanos, a charity in Latin America that runs orphanages
- Nyiakeng Puachue Hmong, a writing system used for the Hmong language
