= NWT =

NWT can mean:

- New World Telecommunications, an Asian telecommunications company
- The New World Translation of the Holy Scriptures, Jehovah's Witnesses' translation of the Bible
- Net Worth Tax or Net Wealth Tax, a levy based on the aggregate value of all household assets
- Norfolk Wildlife Trust
- North West Telecom, telecommunications company serving northwestern Russia
- North West Tonight, the local BBC news broadcast for North West England
- Northwest Territories, a territory of Canada
- Nya Wermlands-Tidningen, a local newspaper published in Värmland, Sweden
