= NAV =

NAV or Nav may refer to:

== Government agencies ==
- Norwegian Labour and Welfare Administration, Norwegian public welfare agency, the Norwegian abbreviation and common name is NAV.
- Nemzeti Adó- és Vámhivatal, Hungarian Tax and Customs agency, commonly referred to as NAV.

== Medicine and biology ==
- Na_{v}, voltage-gated sodium channels
- nerve-artery-vein (anatomy), when all these follow a common pathway
- Nomina Anatomica Veterinaria, veterinary textbook

== Computers ==
- Network allocation vector, a method to avoid collisions in a shared transmission medium
- Norton AntiVirus, antivirus software developed by Symantec Corporation
- Microsoft Dynamics NAV, an enterprise resource planning software product from Microsoft

== Finance ==
- Net asset value, a fund's price per share

== Music ==
- Nav (rapper) (stylized as NAV), a Canadian rapper, singer, and record producer
  - Nav (mixtape), his 2017 debut commercial mixtape

== Places ==
- Nav, Afghanistan
- Nav, Iran (disambiguation)
- Nav (Slavic folklore), or Nawia, an underworld in Slavonic mythology

== Transportation ==
- Nevşehir Kapadokya Airport, Nevşehir, Turkey, IATA airport code
- Navigation

== Other uses ==
- Navajo language's ISO 639 code
- New Arabic Version, a translation of the Bible into Arabic
- Jav, Prav and Nav, three worlds in the Book of Veles
