= NHO =

NHO or nho may refer to:

- Confederation of Norwegian Enterprise (Norwegian: Næringslivets Hovedorganisasjon, NHO), an employers organisation in Norway
- National Hydrographic Office, headquarters of the Indian Naval Hydrographic Department
- Natural hybrid orbitals, one of a set of natural localized orbital sets in quantum chemistry, see Natural bond orbital
- Takuu language, a Polynesian language spoken in Papua New Guinea (iso 639-3: nho)
- Nitroxyl, a chemical compound well known in the gas phase, with the formula NHO
- N-Heterocyclic olefins, a neutral heterocyclic compound
