= Niv =

Niv, NIV, or NiV may refer to:

- New International Version, a translation of the Bible into English
- Nipah virus infection, a highly virulent human pathogen
- Niv Art Movies, a film production company of India
- Niv Art Centre, in New Delhi, India
- Non-invasive ventilation, a medical treatment
