= NJ (disambiguation) =

NJ is the U.S. postal code for the state of New Jersey.

Nj or NJ may also stand for:

== Places ==
- Narva-Jõesuu, Estonia
- Nanjing, Jiangsu, China

== Science and technology ==
- Nanojoule (nJ), an International System of Units (SI) unit of energy equal to 10^{−9} joules
- Neighbor joining, a bioinformatic method for the construction of phylogenetic trees

== Other uses ==
- Nj (digraph), a Latin-script digraph
- Nippon Jamboree
- Nordjyske Jernbaner, a Danish railway
- Napierville Junction Railway
- NewJeans, a South Korean girl group
- NJ.com, a news website

== See also ==
- Nje, a letter of the Cyrillic script
