= NE =

NE, Ne or ne may refer to:

== Arts and entertainment ==
- Neutral Evil, an alignment in the American role-playing game Dungeons & Dragons
- New Edition, an American vocal group
- Nicomachean Ethics, a collection of ten books by Greek philosopher Aristotle

== Businesses and organizations ==
- Mobico Group, formerly National Express, an English public transport operator
- Natural England, an English government agency
- New England Patriots, a professional American football team in Foxborough, Massachusetts
- New Hope (Macau), a Macau political party
- SkyEurope Airlines, a Slovak airline
- New Era Cap Company, an American headwear company

== Language ==
- Ne (cuneiform), a cuneiform sign
- Ne (kana), a Japanese written character
- Nepali language
- Modern English, sometimes abbreviated NE (to avoid confusion with Middle English)

== Places ==
- NE postcode area, UK, a postcode for the City of Newcastle upon Tyne, Tyne and Wear
- Ne, Liguria, Italy, a comune in the Province of Genoa
- Né (river), a river in southwestern France
- Near East
- Niger, ISO 3166-1 country code
  - .ne, the country code top level domain (ccTLD) for Niger
- Canton of Neuchâtel, a canton of Switzerland
- Nebraska, US (postal abbreviation)
- New England, a region of the United States consisting of six states

== Science and technology ==
=== Computing ===
- .ne, the country code top level domain (ccTLD) for Niger
- ne (text editor), a console text editor
- NE (complexity), a class in computational complexity theory
- Network element, a manageable logical entity uniting one or more physical devices
- New Executable, a computer file format

=== Other uses in science and technology ===
- Electron density ($n_e$)
- N_{e}, effective population size
- Ne, for Number English, a unit of measure for cotton fiber
- Inequality operator, a term used in programming languages as a "not equal to" operator
- Nash equilibrium, a solution concept in game theory
- Neon, symbol Ne, a chemical element
- Norepinephrine, a neurotransmitter

== Other uses ==
- N.E. and N.E.2d, abbreviations for North Eastern Reporter, US law reports
- Né, indicating the name given to a male child at birth, equivalent to the feminine née
- Nationalencyklopedin, a Swedish national encyclopedia
- Nitro Express, a brand of rifle cartridges
- Northeast (direction), one of the four ordinal directions
