= NM =

NM, nm, and variations may refer to:

== Businesses and organizations ==
- Northwestern Mutual, financial services company in Wisconsin, United States
- Air Madrid (IATA airline designator NM), Spanish airline
- Mount Cook Airline (IATA airline designator NM), New Zealand airline
- Manx2 (IATA airline designator NM), Isle of Man airline
- Namarakieana Movement (NM), political party in Vanuatu
- Niagara Movement

== Places ==
- The National Mall in Washington, D.C., United States
- Navi Mumbai, India
- New Mexico, a state of the United States (postal abbreviation)
- Inner Mongolia, an autonomous region of China (Guobiao abbreviation and ISO-3166-2:CN code NM)
- Northern Mindanao, an administrative region in southern Philippines

== Science and technology ==
=== Medicine ===
- Nemaline myopathy, a neuromuscular disorder
- Neuromelanin, a dark pigment found in the brain
- Nuclear medicine, a medical imaging modality

=== Units of measure ===
- Nanometre (nm), an SI unit of length, equal to 10^{−9} m (a thousand-millionth of a metre)
- Nanomolar (nM), in chemistry, one thousand-millionth molar
- Nautical mile (NM or nmi), a unit of length used for maritime and aerospace purposes
- Newton-metre (N m, may also be written as N·m), a unit of torque
- Normal cubic metre (Nm^{3}), a unit of volume (normal referring to standard temperature and pressure)
- Normalizovaný muštomer (°NM), a scale of wine must density
- Number metric, a measure of linear density of fibers in textiles

=== Other uses in science and technology ===
- nm (Unix), a computer program used as an aid for debugging
- NM, nonmetallic-sheathed electrical cable (in North America), nowadays typically thermoplastic-sheathed cable
- Noise margin, the amount by which a signal exceeds the minimum amount for proper operation

== Other uses ==
- Never mind, or nothing much or not much in Internet slang
- Namma Metro, a rapid transit line in Bangalore, India
- Nao Sena Medal, a gallantry award for servicemen in the Indian Navy
- National monument
  - National monument (United States)
- National Master, a chess title
- no mark, an athletics abbreviation indicating that an athlete participated in a field event but recorded no valid height, jump, or throw.
