= NNO =

NNO may stand for:

- Nuveen North Carolina Dividend Advantage Municipal Fund 2 (stock symbol: NNO)
- Natural number object, in category theory, a subfield of mathematics
- National Night Out, a crime prevention activity in the United States
- Nynorsk, ISO 639-2 and ISO 639-3 language codes
- Nitrous oxide
