= NSDL =

NSDL may refer to:

- National Science Digital Library, a free online library
- National Securities Depository Limited, the largest securities depository in India
