= National Symphony Orchestra (disambiguation) =

National Symphony Orchestra may refer to any of several orchestras playing classical music

- The National Symphony Orchestra is based in Washington, D.C., USA.
- Argentine National Symphony Orchestra, founded 1948
- Danish National Symphony Orchestra, founded 1925
- Estonian National Symphony Orchestra, founded 1926
- Iraqi National Symphony Orchestra, re-established 1970
- Latvian National Symphony Orchestra
- Lebanese National Symphony Orchestra, founded 1999
- Myanmar National Symphony Orchestra
- National Iranian Symphony Orchestra, founded 1998
- National Symphony Orchestra of Colombia, re-established 2004
- National Symphony Orchestra of Cuba, established early 1920s
- National Symphony Orchestra (Dominican Republic), founded 1941
- National Symphony Orchestra Ghana
- RAI National Symphony Orchestra (Italy), founded 1994
- RTÉ National Symphony Orchestra of Ireland, adopted name 1989
- National Symphony Orchestra (Mexico), founded 1946
- National Symphony Orchestra (Peru), founded 1938
- National Symphony Orchestra of Polish Radio
- National Symphony Orchestra (Taiwan), founded 1986
- National Symphony Orchestra (UK), founded 1941, disbanded 1946
- National Symphony Orchestra of Ukraine
- Syrian National Symphony Orchestra, Damascus
