= NGN =

NGN can refer to:

- Neurogenins, a family of bHLH transcription factors involved in specifying neuronal differentiation
- Nigerian naira, currency by ISO 4217 code
- Noida Greater Noida Expressway, in Delhi, India

Telecommunications

- Next Generation Networking, a broad term to describe some key architectural evolutions in telecommunication core and access networks that will be deployed over the next 5–10 years
- Non-geographic numbers, in the UK, telephone numbers not assigned to geographic areas or exchanges

Media, publishing, and entertainment

- Nippon Golden Network, a Cable television network broadcasting Japanese programs in Hawaii, United States
- No Good Nick, an upcoming American comedy web television series.
- News Group Newspapers, the umbrella organisation for Rupert Murdoch's news empire.
