= NGR =

NGR may refer to:

== Countries by code ==
- Niger (ITU:NGR)
- Nigeria (IOC:NGR)

== Rail transport ==
- Natal Government Railways, British rail company in Africa (1877–1910)
- Nepal Government Railway, between Nepal and India (1927–1965)
- New Generation Rollingstock, a class of train used in Queensland, Australia from 2017
- North Gloucestershire Railway (now Toddington Narrow Gauge Railway), England

== Other uses ==
- Nonhomogeneous Gaussian regression, a statistical method for calibrating weather forecasts
