= New Village School =

Private school in California, United States

Coordinates: 37°52′11″N 122°30′20″W

Information
- Established: 2008; 18 years ago
- Grades: Preschool - Grade 8
- Website: thenewvillageschool.org

The New Village School (NVS) is a private school in Sausalito, California founded in 2008 with a focus on individualized education. The school serves students in Marin County and North San Francisco. It serves children from preschool through 8th grade.

== Campus ==
The campus is located on the North side of Sausalito at Martin Luther King, Jr. Park and provides private outdoor spaces for all ages and a produce garden managed by the children and teachers, as well as access to a large grass field, a softball field/backstop, and a 1/3 mile track area. In October 2021, the Sausalito City Council unanimously approved the New Village School to “expand a preschool program” and “use more outdoor space on the campus.”. The New Village School also owns a sustainable farm in Novato that students visit regularly during the Classroom Without Walls (outdoor education) program.

== Student life ==
The school holds a Winter Fair and the Cherry Blossom Festival, among other celebrations.
