= NLP =

NLP commonly refers to:

- Natural language processing, a field of computer science and linguistics
- Neuro-linguistic programming, a pseudoscientific method aimed at modifying human behavior

== Computer programming ==
- Natural-language programming, a programming paradigm

== Libraries ==
- National Library of Pakistan

== Mathematics ==
- Nonlinear programming, solving optimisation problems with nonlinear constraints

== Medicine ==
- No light perception, a diagnosis of severe blindness

== Political parties ==
- National Liberal Party (disambiguation)
- National Liberation Party (disambiguation)
- National Labour Party (disambiguation)
- Natural Law Party, a trans-national union of political parties, with national branches in over 80 countries
  - Natural Law Party of Canada
  - Natural Law Party (Ireland)
  - Natural Law Party of Israel
  - Natural Law Party of New Zealand
  - Natural Law Party of Ontario
  - Natural Law Party of Quebec
  - Natural Law Party (Trinidad and Tobago)
  - Natural Law Party (United States)
