= NDAA =

NDAA may refer to:

- National Defense Authorization Act in the US
  - "NDAA" is used colloquially for the section added in 2012 allowing indefinite detention of persons the government suspects of involvement in terrorism without charges, showing cause, or due process.
- National Democratic Alliance Army in Burma
- North Dallas Adventist Academy
