= National Command Authority =

National Command Authority may refer to:

- National Command Authority (Pakistan), nuclear command and control agency headed by the prime minister
- National Command Authority (United States), Department of Defense term formerly used to refer to the president in the context of nuclear weapons
