= NFG =

NFG or nfg may refer to:

- New Found Glory, an American band
- National Fuel Gas (NYSE: NFG), a diversified energy company
- Marine Corps Air Station Camp Pendleton (FAA LID: NFG), a US Marine Corps airfield in California
- Ahwai language (ISO 639:nfg), of Nigeria
- Nationale Forschungs- und Gedenkstätten, former administrator of the Goethe-Nationalmuseum
