= NSV =

NSV or nSv may refer to:

Nationalist organisations

- National Socialist Vanguard, a US neo-Nazi group
- Nationalistische Studentenvereniging, the Flemish Nationalist Student Association
- Nationalsozialistische Volkswohlfahrt, the Nazi People's Welfare Organization
- National-Social Association, a political party of the former German empire, initials NSV

Science and technology

- Nullsoft Streaming Video format
- New Catalogue of Suspected Variable Stars
- Nanosievert, a unit of radiation
- Newton–Størmer–Verlet method in mathematics
- No scalpel vasectomy

Other

- Nürnberger-Spielkarten-Verlag, German game and playing card manufacturer
- NSV machine gun, Soviet, 12.7 mm
- Neighbourhoods for a Sustainable Vancouver, British Columbia, Canada
