= NYT (disambiguation) =

NYT, or The New York Times (founded 1851), is an American daily newspaper.

NYT or nyt may also refer to:

== Organizations ==
- National Youth Theatre, a British charity
- The New York Times Company, an American mass-media company (ticker symbol: NYT)
- Yeti Airlines, Kathmandu, Nepal (ICAO code: NYT)

== Other uses ==
- Nyt, a weekly supplement of Helsingin Sanomat
- Nyawaygi language, an extinct Australian Aboriginal language (ISO 639-3 code: nyt)
- Nay Pyi Taw International Airport, Naypyidaw, Myanmar (IATA code: NYT)

== See also ==
- Nyt Tidsskrift, a former Norwegian magazine
