= NDH (disambiguation) =

The NDH (Nezavisna Država Hrvatska) was the Croatian acronym for the Independent State of Croatia, an Axis puppet state during World War II.

NDH may also refer to:

- Neue Deutsche Härte, a music genre
- North District Hospital, a hospital in Sheung Shui, Hong Kong
