= NQ =

NQ may refer to:

== Places ==
- Northern Quarter (Manchester), England
- North Queensland, Australia
- Nuqat al Khams, Libya (ISO 3166-2:LY-NQ)

== Technology ==
- NQ Mobile, a mobile Internet provider
- NQ, a portable Server Message Block library family

Normal Quality, a display resolution mode

== Other uses ==
- Air Japan (IATA: NQ)
- NQ Vulpeculae, a 1976 nova
- National Qualifications, in Scotland
- Le Nouveau Quotidien, Swiss newspaper (1991–1998)
