= NUG =

NUG may refer to any of a number of entities:

== Full name ==
- Nug (graffiti artist)

== Acronym ==
- National Unity Government of Myanmar, a parallel government created in the aftermath of the 2021 Myanmar coup d'état by supporters of ousted Aung San Suu Kyi.
- Guidelines for National Unification between mainland China and Taiwan
- Necrotizing ulcerative gingivitis, a subclassification of the Necrotizing periodontal diseases
