= NIPR =

NIPR as an acronym may refer to:

- NIPRNet, the Non-Classified Internet Protocol Router Network, a private IP network owned by the United States Department of Defense that is used to exchange unclassified information
- National Institute of Polar Research (Japan), the Japanese research institute for Antarctica
- Northern Ireland Publication Resource, now renamed NIPR: the National Collection of Northern Ireland Publications, held at the Linen Hall Library
- North Island-Powell River, a federal electoral district in BC, Canada
