= NCR =

NCR may refer to:

== Arts, entertainment and media ==
- A Nature Conservation Review, a 1977 book known as NCR
- National Catholic Reporter, an American newspaper
- New California Republic, a fictional faction in Fallout
- NCR: Not Criminally Responsible, a 2013 Canadian film

== Businesses and organisations ==
- NCR Corporation, now split into two companies:
  - NCR Atleos
  - NCR Voyix
- Non-conformance report, a documented deviation from a quality standard

== Places ==
- National Capital Region (Canada), Ottawa and the neighbouring city of Gatineau
- National Capital Region (India), centered on Delhi
- National Capital Region (Japan), the Greater Tokyo Area
- National Capital Region (Philippines), Metro Manila
- National Capital Region (United States), Washington metropolitan area

== Science and technology ==
- Numeric character reference, a markup construct in computing
- ${}^nC_r$ or variants, mathematical notation for a Combination

== Transportation ==
- San Carlos Airport (Nicaragua), IATA code NCR
- New Carrollton station, Maryland, U.S., Amtrak code NCR
- National Airlines (N8), ICAO code NCR
- Nipissing Central Railway, in Canada
- North Central Railway zone, in India

== Other uses ==
- National Collegiate Rugby, a rugby union governing body in the U.S.
- Naval Construction Regiment of US Navy Seabees
- North Cross Route, a planned road in London, England
- Not criminally responsible, an insanity defense in law
- Carbonless copy paper, or No Carbon Required

== See also ==
- Capital region
- Northern Central Railway (NCRY), a former railroad in the U.S.
