= NLW =

NLW may refer to:

- National League West, in Major League Baseball
- National Library of Wales, Aberystwyth, Wales
- Newton-le-Willows, Merseyside, England
  - Newton-le-Willows railway station (by CRS code)
- Non-lethal weapon, e.g. Tasers and tear gas
- Afrojack (or NLW; born 1987), Dutch house music producer and DJ
