= NXG =

NXG or nxg may refer to:

- NXG, the National Rail station code for New Cross Gate railway station, London, England
- NXG, the Telegraph code for Nanchang West railway station, Jiangxi, China
- nxg, the ISO 639-3 code for Ngad'a language, Flores, Indonesia
