= NRTA =

NRTA may mean:

- Nantucket Regional Transit Authority
- National Retired Teachers Association; a retired teachers insurance organization that today is now the AARP.
- National Radio and Television Administration
