= NOLF =

NOLF may refer to:

- The Operative: No One Lives Forever, a 2000 video game
- Naval outlying landing field, a type of U.S. Navy military airfield
