= NanKang Biotech Incubation Center =

NanKang Biotech Incubation Center (NBIC) 南港生技育成中心
- Company type: Non-profit research institute
- Industry: Biotech incubator
- Founded: 2004
- Headquarters: 17th Floor, 3 YuanQu St., NanKang District, Taipei, 115, Taiwan, R.O.C.
- Website: http://www.nbic.org.tw

The NanKang Biotech Incubation Center (NBIC; Chinese: 南港生技育成中心) is a biotech incubator formed by the SME Foundation of the Ministry of Economic Affairs, ROC and managed by the Development Center for Biotechnology. The incubator focuses on the initiation and development of biotech startups with an emphasis of the biotech industry including pharmaceuticals, medical devices and applied biotech.

NBIC is a model incubator in biotech industry, different from the university affiliated incubator, supported by the SME Foundation. As of 2015, the incubator has 21 Class I client companies, 1 Class II, and 20 Class III. Beside office space, the incubator provides wet laboratory with instruments and facilities.

== History ==
NanKang Biotech Incubation Center (NBIC) is based in Taipei's Nankang Software Park. Opened on 27 August 2004, it occupies 1,200 ping (4,000 m^{2}; 43,000 sq ft) of space. The land was leased from The opening ceremony was hosted by Ho Mei-yueh, then Minister of Economic Affairs. Attending guests included Yuan T. Lee, then president of Academia Sinica and Ma Ying-jeou, then Mayor of Taipei.

== Recognition ==
NBIC is accredited by the National Business Incubation Association (NBIA) since 2011 as a Soft Landings incubator. A full article reported the incubator extensively in The Business Incubator, pp34–39, Volume 1 Issue 1, June–September 2012.

== Parent organization ==
Development Center for Biotechnology/SMEA
