= NCND =

NCND may refer to:

- "Neither Confirm Nor Deny", the Glomar response to a US Freedom of Information Act
  - Neither confirming nor denying, in U.S. security policy; See Iowa-class battleship
  - Neither Confirm Nor Deny, a policy regarding UK Defence Nuclear Material Transport Operations
- Non-Circumvent and Non-Disclosure; See List of business and finance abbreviations

- Non-circumvent agreement
- Non-disclosure agreement
