= NCW =

NCW may refer to:

- National Commission for Women, an Indian government organization
- Neocatechumenal Way, a group within the Catholic Church
- Newcastlewest, a town in County Limerick, Ireland
- New College Worcester, England, for visually-impaired students
- Network Centric Warfare, using information technology for battlefield advantage
- Northern Championship Wrestling, professional wrestling promotion in Quebec
- NCW Femmes Fatales, women's professional wrestling promotion in Quebec
- National Chemistry Week, an annual celebration of chemistry in the United States
