= NTZ =

NTZ may mean

- "Number of trailing zeros", see find first set
- NTZ Stadium, homeground of SKA-Sverdlovsk
- Natuzzi (NYSE ticker symbol)
- the ISO code of the Saudi Arabian–Iraqi neutral zone
- No transgression zone, a no fly zone between two parallel runways
