= NTP =

NTP may refer to:

== Government ==
- National Toxicology Program, a program of the United States Department of Health and Human Services
- National Transport Plan, a ten-year plan of Norway

== Organizations ==
- Nation Transformation Party, a political party in Papua New Guinea
- New Teacher Project, a US non-profit organization
- Norsk Teknisk Porselen, Norwegian ceramics manufacturer
- Northern Territory Police, the police force in the Northern Territory of Australia
- NTP, Inc., an American company founded by inventor Thomas J. Campana Jr.

== Science and technology ==
=== Computing ===
- Network Time Protocol, for synchronizing clocks over a computer network

=== Chemistry ===
- Normal temperature and pressure, standardizing experimental conditions

=== Biology ===
- Nucleoside triphosphate, derivaties of nucleic acids, a prominent example being ATP

=== Rocket Propulsion ===
- Nuclear thermal propulsion, producing thrust through nuclear powered heating of gas

== Other uses ==
- Ninh Thuận Province, a province in Vietnam
