= NCE =

NCE may stand for:

- Newark College of Engineering, a part of the New Jersey Institute of Technology
- New chemical entity, an investigational drug
- New Civil Engineer, the weekly magazine of the Institution of Civil Engineers
- Nigerian Certificate in Education
- Non-commercial educational radio broadcasting
- The IATA code for Nice Côte d'Azur Airport
- Normal curve equivalent, a statistical measure related to percentile rank
- The National Counselor Examination for Licensure and Certification of the National Board for Certified Counselors
- New Clee railway station, England; National Rail station code NCE.
- Northcote railway station, Melbourne
