= NRT =

NRT may refer to:

== Businesses and organizations ==
- NRT (company), formerly National Realty Trust, an American real-estate brokerage
- New Road Team, Nepalese sports club
- NRT News, Iraqi broadcaster

== Medicine ==
- Neuroreflexotherapy, alternative treatment for back pain
- Nicotine replacement therapy, to stop smoking
- Thalamic reticular nucleus in vertebrates' brains

== Places ==
- Narita International Airport, Chiba prefecture, Japan (by IATA code)
- Nethertown railway station, Cumbria, England (by station code)

== Science and technology ==
- Near real-time in telecommunications
- Net register tonnage, the volume of cargo a ship can carry
- Non-Real-Time Content Delivery of digital TV

== Other uses ==
- National Recreation Trail, US designation
- Niagara Region Transit, a public transit system in Canada
- Norm-referenced test, test scored relative to the performance of other participants
