= NTR =

NTR may refer to:

== Arts and entertainment ==
- Netorare, a genre of Japanese pornography
- No Through Road (web series), a 2009 British short film/web series
- NTR: Kathanayakudu, a 2019 Indian Telugu film about N. T. Rama Rao
- NTR: Mahanayakudu, a 2019 sequel to NTR: Kathanayakudu, also about N. T. Rama Rao
- Lakshmi's NTR, a 2019 Indian Telugu film about N. T. Rama Rao
- NTR: Netsuzou Trap, manga series

== Businesses and organizations ==
- NTR plc, an Irish renewable energy company
- National Transcontinental Railway, a historic Canadian railway
- Nonprofit Technology Resources, a computer-refurbishing nonprofit organization
- NTR Trust, a not-for-profit Indian social welfare organization named after N. T. Rama Rao
- Omroep NTR, a Dutch public service broadcaster

== Places ==
- NTR district, administrative district in Andhra Pradesh, India named after N. T. Rama Rao

== People ==
- N. T. Rama Rao (1923–1996), known as NTR, Indian Telugu actor and politician
- N. T. Rama Rao Jr. (born 1983), or NTR Jr., Indian Telugu film actor and grandson of N. T. Rama Rao

== Science ==
- Neurotensin receptor 1, a protein encoded by the NTSR1, or NTR, gene
- Nuclear thermal rocket, a proposed spacecraft propulsion technology
- Non-catalytic tyrosine-phosphorylated receptors, receptor family present on immune cells

== Transport ==
- Del Norte International Airport, Mexico, IATA code NTR
- Northallerton railway station, England, station code NTR
- Nagahori Tsurumi-ryokuchi Line, Japan, a subway line in Osaka

== Other uses ==
- Normal Trade Relations, a legal term in international trade
- Nṯr, Egyptian language word for Ancient Egyptian deities
- No tipo Ritz, 'Not the Ritz type', people considered unworthy of staying at the Hotel Ritz, Madrid
