= NH =

NH or Nh may refer to

== Businesses and organizations ==
- All Nippon Airways (IATA code NH), formerly Nippon Helicopter, Japan's largest airline
- National Agricultural Cooperative Federation, a South Korean cooperative federation also known by its Korean initials NH (Nonghyup)
- New York, New Haven and Hartford Railroad
- NH (media company), formerly Radio & Televisie Noord-Holland, a Dutch broadcasting company
- NH Hotel Group, formerly Navarra Hoteles, a Spanish-based hotel chain
- NH Media ("Nam Hee"), a South Korean entertainment agency
- Nordsjælland Håndbold, a Danish handball team

== Places ==
- New Hampshire, US (postal abbreviation NH)
- New Haven, a city in Connecticut, United States
- Noroton Heights, Connecticut, a town in Connecticut, United States
- North Holland, a province in the Netherlands
- Nowa Huta, a district of Kraków, Poland

== In science and technology ==
- Nh (digraph), an orthographic concept
- National Hose Thread, a threaded connection standard used on hose couplings
- Nickel hydride, a type of rechargeable battery
- Nihonium, symbol Nh, a chemical element
- NH, molecular formula for imidogen

== Other uses ==
- National Highway, a road designation in many countries
- National Highways, an agency that manages England's motorways
- NetHack, a computer game
- Nishan-e-Haider, a Pakistani military award
- Nishan-e-Hamidiya, an Indian knighthood awarded by the Royal House of Rampur
- No-hitter, a baseball term
- Niall Horan
- Nobile (aristocracy), an Italian hereditary title abbreviated N.H. (Italian: Nobile Homine) for men
