= NLD =

NLD may refer to:

== Codes ==
- Dutch language (ISO 639-3 language code nld)
- Nagaland, a state in northeastern India (postal code NLD)
- The Netherlands (ISO 3166-1 alpha-3 country code NLD)
- Quetzalcóatl International Airport (IATA airport code NLD; ICAO airport code MMNL), in Nuevo Laredo, Tamaulipas, Mexico

== Other uses ==
- National Landcare Directory, a directory of Australian landcare
- National League for Democracy, a political party in Myanmar (Burma)
- National League for Democracy (Tanzania), a political party in Tanzania
- Necrobiosis lipoidica diabeticorum, a skin disorder
- Nonverbal learning disorder
- North London derby, game between English Premier League football clubs Arsenal and Tottenham Hotspur
- Novell Linux Desktop, software

== See also ==
- NLDS
