= NSB =

NSB may refer to:

== Art, entertainment, and media ==
- Natural Snow Buildings, a French experimental music duo
- Nihilist Spasm Band, Canadian free improvisation musical collective
- Nu skool breaks, a subgenre of breakbeat music originating during the period between 1998 and 2002
- Nature Structural & Molecular Biology, an academic journal
- Nippon Shortwave Broadcasting (now Radio Nikkei), a domestic commercial shortwave radio station in Japan

== Politics and government ==
- FBI National Security Branch, the United States Federal Bureau of Investigation's branch responsible for investigating threats to national security
- National Seamen Board of the Philippines
- National Science Board, the governing body of the National Science Foundation
- National Security Bureau (Republic of China), the intelligence agency of the Republic of China (Taiwan)
- National Socialist Bloc, an historical political movement in Sweden
- National Socialist Movement in the Netherlands (Nationaal-Socialistische Beweging), a fascist political movement in the Netherlands (1931–1945)
- Naval Submarine Base (United States):
  - Naval Submarine Base Kings Bay
  - Naval Submarine Base New London
- Norwegian State Railways (1883–1996), a former state-owned railway company that operated most of the railway network in Norway
- Vy, formerly Norwegian State Railways (Norges Statsbaner), a government-owned railway company which operates most passenger train services in Norway

== Education ==
=== Competitions ===
- National Science Bowl, a middle and high school academic competition
- Scripps National Spelling Bee, a competition in the United States

=== Schools ===
- Newcastle School for Boys, a British independent school
- North Sydney Boys High School, an Australian high school
- Northampton School for Boys, a British Secondary School

== Other uses ==
- NSB Niederelbe Schiffahrtsgesellschaft
- National Savings Bank (Sri Lanka)
- National Scenic Byway
- Neusiedler Seebahn
- Nevada State Bank, a bank in the United States
- New Smyrna Beach, Florida, a city in the United States
- Newtown Savings Bank, a bank in the United States
- Normans Bay railway station, a railway station in Sussex, England
