= MVG =

MVG may refer to:

- Michael van Gerwen, a professional darts player
- MVG, the airline code for Moldavian Airlines
- Mothra vs. Godzilla, 1964 film
- Münchner Verkehrsgesellschaft or Munich Transportation Company, the company responsible for operating public transport in Munich, Germany

- MVG Museum, Munich museum about the above company
- MVG Class A, class of train operated by the above company
- MVG Class B, class of train operated by the above company
- MVG Class C, class of train operated by the above company

== See also ==
- List of Major Vegetation Groups in Australia (MVGs)
