= NLL =

NLL may refer to:

== Sports ==
- Two unrelated lacrosse leagues by the name of National Lacrosse League:
  - National Lacrosse League, an ongoing league formed in 1987
  - National Lacrosse League (1974–75), a defunct league formed in 1974
- Northern Lakes League, a Northwest Ohio High School athletic conference
- Nación Lucha Libre, a Mexican professional wrestling promotion

== Politics ==
- Northern Limit Line, a disputed maritime boundary between North and South Korea
  - Northern Limit Line (2015 film), South Korean naval thriller film
- National Liberation League in Palestine, a defunct political party in Palestine

== Institutions ==
- New Line Learning Academy, a school in Loose, England
- The National Library of Latvia
- Foundation NLL, a former name of the Royal Netherlands Aerospace Centre

== Transportation ==
- The North London Line, a railway line in London, England
