= NFI =

NFI may refer to:

== Organisations ==
- National Fatherhood Initiative, an American organisation promoting responsible fatherhood
- National Fisheries Institute, a trade association in the USA
- Net Foreign Investment, a macroeconomic principle
- Netherlands Forensic Institute (in Dutch: Nederlands Forensisch Instituut)
- Newfrontiers, a group of charismatic churches that used to be known as NFI (New Frontiers International)
- NFI Group, a manufacturer of buses in Canada
  - New Flyer Industries, a subsidiary and predecessor of NFI Group
- Norwegian Film Institute, a government agency that supports the Norwegian film industry

== Sport ==
- Netball Federation of India, national body for netball in India
- NFI, the national identifier code for Norfolk Island in international sporting competitions
- Non-football injury and illness lists, roster designations used in the National Football League

== Other uses ==
- Non-food item, a term used especially in humanitarian contexts for an item other than food
