= NIU =

NIU or Niu can refer to:

== Universities ==
- Northern Illinois University (DeKalb, Illinois, United States)
- Northland International University (Dunbar, Wisconsin, United States)
- National Intelligence University (Bethesda, Maryland, United States)
- National Ilan University (Yilan City, Yilan County, Taiwan)

== Chinese topics ==
Niu (Chinese: 牛; pinyin: Niú) means cattle (ox, bull, cow, etc.) in Chinese.

- Niu (surname), Chinese surname
- Ox (zodiac)
- Ox (Chinese constellation)
- Radical 93 or radical cow
- Niu Technologies, an electric scooter company headquartered in Changzhou, China

== Other topics ==
- Niue (ISO country code)
- Network Interface Unit (telecommunications); see Network Interface Device (NID)
- Niu Sale (born 1959), American football player
- David Niu, Australian-American rugby league footballer and coach
- Coconut, niu is the Hawaiian word
