= NXL =

NXL or nxl may refer to:

- NXL, the ASX stock symbol for Nuix, an Australian technology company
- nxl, the ISO 639-3 code for South Nuaulu language, Maluku Islands, Indonesia
