= NBT =

NBT may refer to:

== Arts and media ==
- National Black Theatre, New York, U.S.
- National Black Theatre (Australia) (1972–1977), Sydney, Australia
- Nature Biotechnology, a scientific journal
- Navbharat Times, an Indian newspaper
- Never Been Thawed, a 2005 American film
- The Next BIG Thing, a singing talent contest hosted by Radio Disney
- Nothing But Thieves, a British rock band

== Organizations ==
- National Bank of Tajikistan
- National Book Trust, a publishing house under the Indian Ministry of Education
- National Broadcasting Services of Thailand, formerly Radio Thailand and Television of Thailand
- North Bristol NHS Trust, a hospital group in England.

== Transport ==
- Norbiton railway station, London, National Rail station code
- Norse Atlantic Airways, ICAO code NBT

== Science and technology ==
- Natural bobtail, an animal's tail which grows short or is missing
- NetBIOS over TCP/IP, a computer network protocol
- Neurophysiological Biomarker Toolbox, a computing toolbox used in biology
- New Breeding Techniques, a genetic engineering technology
- Nitro blue tetrazolium chloride, a chemical compound used in immunology
- Sodium bismuth titanate, a relaxor ferroelectric material
