= NWA =

NWA most commonly refers to:

- N.W.A ("Niggaz Wit Attitudes"), a hip hop group from Compton, California
- National Wrestling Alliance, a professional wrestling organization

NWA or Nwa may also refer to:

== Places ==
- Nwa, Kale, a village in Burma
- Nwa, Cameroon, a commune in Donga-Mantung, Cameroon
- North Waziristan, an administrative region in Pakistan
- Northwest Arkansas, the Fayetteville–Springdale–Rogers metropolitan region of the U.S. state of Arkansas

== Organizations ==
- National Weather Association, a U.S. meteorological society
- National Workers Alliance, a far-right Australian group established by former actor Damien Richardson
- Neighborhood watch association; see neighborhood watch
- Nelson Weavers' Association, defunct British trade union
- New Women's Association, a Japanese women's rights organization (1919-1922)
- Northwest Airlines (ICAO code and abbreviation), a defunct U.S. airline
- North-Western Area Command (RAAF), a defunct Royal Australian Air Force command
- Nuer White Army, a militant organization active in South Sudan

== Sports ==
- National Wrestling Association, a former offshoot of the U.S. National Boxing Association
- The NWA (wrestling stable), a 1998 U.S. wrestling stable

== Other uses ==
- Narre Warren railway station, Melbourne
- National Wildlife Area, a conservation designation for certain geographical regions in Canada
- New Weird America, a subgenre of psychedelic and indie music, popularized in the '60s and '70s
- New Word Alive, a Christian conference held in Hafan Y Môr, Wales
- Northwest Afternoon, a former US television talk show
- Northwest Africa, a general region used in classification of meteorites
