= Ndo =

Ndo or NDO may refer to,

- BBC Northern Dance Orchestra, a radio orchestra in the United Kingdom
- Daniel Ndo, a prominent practitioner in the theatre of Cameroon
- Joseph N'Do, a former Cameroonian footballer
- Natural Disaster Organisation, a former name of Emergency Management Australia
- New Deck Order, the order a deck of playing cards comes in
- Ndo, the traditional marriage ceremony in Okobo, Nigeria. See Okobo, Akwa Ibom § Traditional marriage ceremony (Ndo)
- Ndo language, a language spoken in the Democratic Republic of Congo and Uganda
- Ndonga dialect (ISO 639:ndo), a Bantu dialect spoken in Namibia and parts of Angola.
- NDO, a defunct UK internet service provider
- Neurogenic detrusor overactivity or Bladder sphincter dyssynergia, a medical condition affecting the urination reflex
- NewDeal Office, now known as GEOS, a computer operating environment, graphical user interface (GUI), and suite of application software.
- Nidubrolu railway station, Andhra Pradesh, India (station code: NDO)
- Praga NDO, a bus manufactured by Czech company Praga between 1938 and 1948
- Swedish National Debt Office, a Swedish government agency dealing with finance
