= NTY =

NTY or nty may refer to:

- NTY, the IATA code for Pilanesberg International Airport, North West, South Africa
- nty, the ISO 639-3 code for Mantsi language, China and Vietnam
