= NDCC =

NDCC may refer to:

- National Defense Cadet Corps
- National Disaster Risk Reduction and Management Council (formerly National Disaster Coordinating Council)
- Non-dihydropyridine calcium channel blocker, a subclass of Calcium channel blockers
