= NV =

NV, nv, nV or Nv may refer to:

== Places and construction ==
=== Regions ===
- Nevada, a state in the United States of America
- North Vietnam
- North Vancouver (disambiguation)

=== Buildings ===
- North Vista Secondary School, Singapore
- NV (Portland, Oregon), a residential tower

=== Construction businesses ===
- NV Homes, a real estate development company now part of NVR, Inc.

== Transportation ==
=== Airlines ===
- Iranian Naft Airlines, Iranian airline (IATA code)
- Air Central NV, Japanese airline (former IATA code)

=== Vehicles ===
- Nissan NV (disambiguation), the prefix of Nissan's commercial vans
  - Nissan NV (North America), a 2011–2021 Japanese full-size van for the North American market
- Nissan NV Pickup, a 1993–1999 Japanese compact pickup truck for the Thai market
- Niutron NV, a 2022–present Chinese electric mid-size SUV
- Tacoma NV, a 2022–present Chinese electric mid-size SUV

== Science and technology ==
=== Mathematics and computing ===
- Nv neuron, an artificial neuron
- Nv network, a term used in BEAM robotics
- An abbreviation for Nvidia, a graphics card company

=== Chemistry and physics ===
- Nitrogen-vacancy center, a color center in diamond
- nv, a unit of neutron flux equal to one thermal neutron per square centimeter per second

=== Biology and medicine ===
- Near vision, an acronym used in eyeglass prescriptions

== Language ==
- Navajo language, ISO 639-1 code nv
- Radical 38 (女), "nü" in pinyin but often typed as "nv" as "v" is an alternate way to express "ü"

== Arts, entertainment, and media ==
- nv (album), 1995 album by Battery
- NV (album), a 2015 collaborative album by Dragged Into Sunlight and Gnaw Their Tongues
- Abbreviation used by Team EnVyUs, an international eSports organization based in the United States
- The New Voice of Ukraine, or New Voice, a digital newspaper based in Ukraine

== Other uses ==
- Naamloze vennootschap (NV), a Dutch term for a public limited-liability company
