= National Academy of Sciences (disambiguation) =

The National Academy of Sciences is a United States nonprofit, non-governmental national academy.

National Academy of Sciences may also refer to (ordered by country):

- National Academy of Sciences of Argentina
- Armenian National Academy of Sciences
- Australian Academy of Science
- Azerbaijan National Academy of Sciences
- National Academy of Sciences of Belarus
- Brazilian Academy of Sciences
- Chinese Academy of Sciences
- French Academy of Sciences
- Georgian National Academy of Sciences
- German National Academy of Sciences Leopoldina
- Indian National Science Academy
- National Academy of Sciences, India
- Kazakhstan Academy of Sciences
- Kenya National Academy of Sciences
- Academy of Sciences of the Democratic People's Republic of Korea
- National Academy of Sciences of the Republic of Korea
- Kyrgyz Academy of Sciences
- Mexican Academy of Sciences
- National Academy of Science and Technology, Philippines
- Singapore National Academy of Science
- National Academy of Sciences of Sri Lanka
- Sudanese National Academy of Sciences
- National Academy of Sciences of Ukraine
- Uganda National Academy of Sciences
- Vietnam Academy of Science and Technology
- Sudanese National Academy of Sciences

== See also ==
- Academy of sciences#List
- National academies of sciences
