= NACMA =

Former agency of the North Atlantic Treaty Organization (NATO)

NACMA was the NATO ACCS Management Agency. It was responsible for the management of the NATO Air Command and Control System (ACCS) programme, which is a $500M project to provide the NATO commands with a new air command and control system from 2009 onwards.

On 1 July 2012 all staff and functions were merged into a new NATO Agency, the NATO Communications and Information Agency (NCIA), where the ACCS project is now managed by the NCIA AirC2 element.
