= National Fluid Power Association =

- National Fluid Power Association logo

- Location within the United States
- Formation: May 1, 1953; 73 years ago
- Founded at: Bedford Springs, Pennsylvania
- Type: Charitable organization
- Legal status: Charity
- Purpose: Meeting the fluid power industry's workforce development needs
- Headquarters: Milwaukee
- Location: Milwaukee, Wisconsin, US
- Coordinates: 43.02078932547269°N 87.99650958730959°W
- Official language: English
- CEO: Markus Rauchhaus
- Vice President, Market Management: Mark Snyder
- Vice President, Sales & Marketing: Christopher Kolbe
- Website: www.nfpa.com

The National Fluid Power Association (NFPA) is an American 501(c)6 industry trade association, founded in 1953.

The NFPA's mission is to serve as a forum where all fluid power channel partners work together to advance fluid power technology, strengthen the fluid power industry, and foster members' success. NFPA members include more than 315 manufacturers of fluid power systems and components, fluid power distributors, suppliers to the fluid power industry, educators and researchers.
