= Sudan National Elections Commission =

- Arabic: المفوضية القومية للإنتخابات

Agency overview
- Formed: 7 July 2008
- Preceding Agency: Sudan National Elections Authority
- Jurisdiction: Sudan
- Headquarters: Khartoum, Sudan
- Agency executive: Abdul-Rahman Ibrahim Al-Dahir, Chairperson
- Key documents: Constitution of Sudan; National Elections Act of 2008

The Sudan National Elections Commission (Arabic: المفوضية القومية للإنتخابات; often referred to as the NEC) is Sudan's election management body, an independent organisation established under the National Elections Act of 2008.

== History ==
The Sudan National Elections Commission (NEC) was established in 2008 under the National Elections Act as part of a broader framework to reform Sudan's electoral process. Its formation followed the Comprehensive Peace Agreement (CPA) of 2005, which sought to resolve conflicts and establish a more inclusive political environment in the country. The NEC replaced the Sudan National Elections Authority, which had previously overseen electoral processes in Sudan.

The creation of the NEC was an essential step in the transition to democratic governance, tasked with ensuring free and fair elections, overseeing voter registration, and managing both presidential and parliamentary elections. The NEC's mandate also includes organizing referendums, such as the landmark 2011 referendum, where South Sudan voted for independence.

The NEC's leadership is appointed by the President, but it operates as an independent body, making it responsible for maintaining neutrality and impartiality in the electoral process. The commission has been chaired by various figures, with Professor Abdul-Rahman Ibrahim Al-Dahir serving as its current chairperson. Over time, the NEC has faced challenges, particularly concerning political instability and logistical issues during election periods.
