= NFHS =

NFHS may refer to:

- National Family Health Survey
- National Federation of State High School Associations
- National Fish Hatchery System
- North Forest High School
- North Forney High School
