= Nass =

Nass or NASS may refer to:

== Places ==
- Nass River, in northern British Columbia
- Nass Camp settlement in British Columbia
- Ngee Ann Secondary School, a secondary school in Tampines, Singapore

== Peoples and cultures ==
- Nass, the Nisga'a language
- People of the Nass, the Nisga'a people of northern British Columbia

== Organizations ==
- nass.gov.ng, the website of the National Assembly (Nigeria)
- National Agricultural Statistics Service (or NASS), part of the U.S. Department of Agriculture
- National Association of Secretaries of State (or NASS), an association of United States Secretaries of State
- National Association of Stable Staff (or NASS), in the UK
- National Asylum Support Service (or NASS), in the UK
- North American Spine Society (or NASS), which publishes The Spine Journal
- North American Sundial Society (or NASS)

== Other uses ==
- Nass (Islam), an Arabic word meaning "a known, or clear, legal injunction"
- Nass Corporation, a Bahraini industrial and construction services conglomerate
- Ninjas & Superspies (or NASS), a role-playing game

== See also ==
- Naas, a town in eastern Ireland
- NaSSA (Noradrenergic and specific serotonergic antidepressant)
