= No holds barred =

No holds barred or No Holds Barred may refer to:

- No Holds Barred (1952 film), a film starring The Bowery Boys
- No Holds Barred (1989 film), a film starring Hulk Hogan
- No Holds Barred (Biohazard album) (1997)
- No Holds Barred (Tweedy Bird Loc album) (1994)
- A 1952 episode of The Adventures of Superman
- No Holds Barred: My Life in Politics, a 1997 memoir by John Crosbie
- No Holds Barred: The Match/The Movie, a pay-per-view event produced by the World Wrestling Federation based on the 1989 film
- Catch wrestling
- Mixed martial arts
- Vale tudo
