= No Strings Attached =

No Strings Attached may refer to:

- No Strings Attached (film), a 2011 romantic comedy film
- No Strings Attached (Meat Puppets album), 1990 compilation CD
- No Strings Attached (Those Darn Accordions album), 1996
- No Strings Attached (NSYNC album), 2000
  - No Strings Attached Tour
- No Strings Attached (Jassi Sidhu album), 2005
- No Strings Attached (Dom & Roland album), 2009
- No Strings Attached (novel), the 170th volume in the Nancy Drew Mystery Series
- No Strings Attached, a 2006 comedy tour by comedian Carlos Mencia
- No Strings Attached, the working title for the British television series That Puppet Game Show
- "No Strings Attached", the working title for "Krytie TV", an episode of the British television series Red Dwarf

== See also ==
- Casual dating
