= Na =

NA, N.A., Na, nA or n/a may refer to:

== Chemistry and physics ==
- Sodium, symbol Na, a chemical element
- Avogadro constant (N_{A})
- Nucleophilic addition, a type of reaction in organic chemistry
- Numerical aperture, a number that characterizes a range of angles in an optical system
- nA, the symbol for nanoampere
- Naturally aspirated engine

== Biology and medicine ==
- Na (tree) or Mesua ferrea, a species of tree native to Sri Lanka
- Neuroacanthocytosis, a neurological condition
- Nomina Anatomica, a former international standard for human anatomical nomenclature
- Noradrenaline, a hormone
- Nucleic acid analogue, compounds analogous to naturally occurring RNA and DNA

== Places ==
=== Current ===
- Namibia (ISO country code)
- Naples (car number plate code: NA), Italy
- North America, a continent
- North Africa, a subcontinent

=== Historical ===
- Netherlands Antilles (former international vehicle registration code: NA)
- Na (Chinese state), a small state of the Chinese Zhou dynasty from the 11th to 8th centuries BC
- Nakoku, or Na, a state in Kyūshū, Japan from the 1st to early 3rd centuries AD

== Names and titles ==
- Na (羅), a Korean surname related to the Chinese surname Luo
- Na, a particle used in Thai noble names
- National Academician, a member of the National Academy of Design

== Art and entertainment ==
- Na (drum), a drum played by Tibetan shamans
- Nahal, Shine's pet Bengal tiger on the Nick Jr. TV show Shimmer and Shine
- New adult fiction, fiction marketed to people 18–30 years old
- Virgin New Adventures, a series of Doctor Who novels
- Na (EP) by Nayeon, 2024
- N/a (EP) by Izna, 2024
- "N/A" (Bring Me the Horizon song), 2024

== Transport ==
- NA, the tailcode of VFA-94
- Nepal Airlines, the national flag carrier airline of Nepal
- North American Airlines (1990–2014, IATA code: NA)
- National Airlines (1934–1980) (IATA code: NA)
- Naturally aspirated engine
- NA MX-5 Miata, the first generation of the Mazda Miata

== Language ==
- Na (cuneiform), a cuneiform sign
- Na (Javanese) (ꦤ), a letter in the Javanese script
- Na (kana), a Japanese kana
- Na dialect, a Sino-Tibetan variety of India
- Na language (Narua), a Sino-Tibetan language of Yunnan, China
- Nauruan language (ISO code: na)

== Organizations ==
- Narcotics Anonymous (NA), a twelve-step program that focuses on recovery from drug addiction
- National Alliance (Latvia), a Latvian political party
- National Alliance (Netherlands), a former Dutch political party
- National Association (disambiguation)
- National Association of Professional Base Ball Players, the first professional baseball league
- Nepali Army, the land military force of Nepal
- Neurotics Anonymous (N/A), a program for recovery from mental and emotional illness
- New Alternative, a parliamentary group in Finland

== Other uses ==
- .na, the top-level domain for Namibia
- N/A, meaning not applicable, not available, or no answer
- N.A., the official designation of federally chartered banks in the United States
- Mosuo or Na, an ethnic group in China near Tibet
- Na people, an ethnic group in India
- National Archives, the archives of a country

== See also ==
- Nå (disambiguation)
- Na Na (disambiguation)
- Na Na Na (disambiguation)
- NAA (disambiguation)
- Nah (disambiguation)
- Nas (disambiguation)
