= Sodium (disambiguation) =

Sodium is a chemical element with symbol Na and atomic number 11.

Sodium may also refer to:

- Sodium (PlayStation Home), a massively multiplayer online game
- Sodium (horse), a thoroughbred racehorse

== See also ==
- Sodium in biology, for the role of sodium in biology and nutrition
- Saline (medicine), for the medical uses of sodium
- Isotopes of sodium
- Na (disambiguation)
