= Naju Na clan =

Korean clan from South Jeolla Province

- Country: Korea
- Current region: Naju
- Founder: Na Bu
- Connected members: Na Kyung-won; Ra Mi-ran; Na Moon-hee; Ra Jong-yil; Rha Woong-bae; Na Woon-gyu; Na Hyeseok
- Website: www.najunassi.net

The Naju Na clan (Korean: 나주 나씨; Hanja: 羅州 羅氏) is one of the Korean clans. Their bon-gwan is in Naju, South Jeolla Province. According to research as of 2000, there were approximately 108,139 members of the Naju Na clan. Their founder was Na Bu, a Chinese native who came to Korea during the Goryeo period. Na Bu settled in Naju, which became the clan's bon-gwan.

== See also ==
- Korean clan names of foreign origin
