= Na (Korean surname) =

Korean surname

- Pronunciation: [na]
- Language: Korean

Origin
- Meaning: gauze, net, catch
- Region of origin: Korea

Other names
- Variant forms: 羅, 蘿, 邏, 那

Korean name
- Hangul: 나
- Hanja: 羅
- RR: Na
- MR: Na
- IPA: [na]

Na or Ra is a relatively uncommon Korean family name. The name is written as 나 (Na) in South Korea, and as 라 (Ra) in North Korea. As of 2015, an estimated 160,946 people (0.32% of the population of South Korea) had the surname Na or Ra.

== Origin ==
The name Na or Ra comes from the Chinese surname Luo, written as 羅. In Cantonese the surname is typically romanized as Lo or Law. Other possible romanizations include Nah, La, Lah, Rha, Rah, and Law.

The variant hanja 那 derives from the Chinese toponymic name Na, referring to a small state during the Zhou dynasty.

== Clans ==
=== Naju Na clan ===
The Naju Na clan (Korean: 나주 나씨; Hanja: 羅州 羅氏) was founded by Na Bu (나부 羅富), a Chinese native who travelled to Korea during the Goryeo period. The clan's bon-gwan is in Naju, South Jeolla Province, where Na Bu settled after coming to Korea. According to research as of 2000, there were 108,139 members of the Naju Na clan. Notable members include Na Kyung-won, Na Moon-hee, Ra Jong-yil, Rha Woong-bae, Na Woon-gyu, and Na Hyeseok.

== Notable people ==
Notable people with the surname Na or Ra include:

=== Na ===
- Na Ah-reum (born 1990), South Korean racing cyclist
- Na Byung-yul (born 1985), South Korean football midfielder
- Na Dae-yong (1556–1612), Korean naval officer during the Imjin War
- Na Dohyang (1902–1927), 20th-century Korean writer
- Na Go-eun (born 1999), South Korean singer with Purple Kiss
- Na Gyun-an (born 1998), South Korean professional baseball player
- Na Hae-ryung (born 1994), South Korean actress and singer, former member of girl groups EXID and Bestie
- Na Haeun (born 2009), South Korean singer and member of girl group Unchild
- Na Hong-jin (born 1974), South Korean film director, producer, and screenwriter
- Na Hoon-a (born 1951), South Korean trot singer
- Na Hye-mi (born 1991), South Korean actress and model
- Na Hye-sok (1896–1948), early Korean poet, painter, and feminist
- Na Hyeon (born 1970), South Korean screenwriter, director, script editor, and actor
- Na Hyeon-jeong (born 1990), South Korean volleyball player
- Na Hyeon-hui (born 1970), South Korean actress and singer
- Na In-woo (born 1994), South Korean actor
- Na Jae-min (born 2000), South Korean rapper and actor, member of boy band NCT
- Na Ji-wan (born 1985), South Korean professional baseball outfielder
- Na Jung-woong (born 1992), South Korean tennis player
- Kevin Na (born 1983), Korean American professional golfer
- Na Kwang-hyun (born 1982), South Korean footballer
- Na Kyung-won (born 1963), South Korean judge and politician
- Na Moon-hee (born 1941), South Korean actress
- Na Ry (born 1985), South Korean model, Miss Korea 2008
- Na Sang-ho (born 1996), South Korean professional footballer
- Na Seok-ju (1892–1926), Korean independence activist
- Na Sung-bum (born 1989), South Korean baseball outfielder
- Na Tae-ju (born 1990), South Korean actor, singer, and taekwondo practitioner
- Na Woon-gyu (1902–1937), early Korean actor, screenwriter, film director
- Na Yeong-seok (born 1976), South Korean television producer and director
- Na Yoon-sun (born 1969), South Korean jazz musician
- Na Young-hee (born 1961), South Korean actress

=== Ra ===
- Ra Heeduck (born 1966), South Korean poet
- Ra Jong-yil (born 1940), South Korean diplomat and author
- Ra Mi-ran (born 1975), South Korean actress
- Rha Woong-bae (1934–2022), South Korean politician and businessman
- Ra Gun-ah (born 1989), American-born South Korean basketball player
