= Nå =

Nå may refer to:

- Nå, Ullensvang, a village in Ullensvang municipality, Vestland county, Norway
- Nå (magazine), a Norwegian magazine published by Libertas from 1952 until 1995

== See also ==
- Na (disambiguation)
