= Tuladha Jejeg =

- Designer(s): Taco Roorda
- Date created: 1838
- Re-issuing foundries: R.S. Wihananto
- License: OFL
- Design based on: Surakartan-Javanese script
- Website: sites.google.com/site/jawaunicode/

Tuladha Jejeg is a Javanese-script typeface designed by Taco Roorda in 1838 and digitized by R.S. Wihananto. Roorda's design is based on the contemporary handwritten Surakartan-Javanese manuscript. The letters are composed of alternating thick and thin strokes, and some have serifs. The typeface was widely used for over a century during the Dutch East Indies colonial era. Wihananto's Unicode font of the same name is bundled into MediaWiki for use in Javanese-language editions of Wikimedia projects.

Wihananto's font is available on SIL's Open Font License. Version 2.0.1 was released on 15 June 2013. It utilizes Graphite to render the complexities of Javanese script. OpenType version of the font without Graphite requirement was published on 30 August 2022 by Fadhl Haqq.
