= Na (Javanese) =

na
- ꦤ
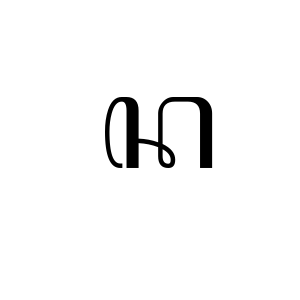
- Aksara nglegena

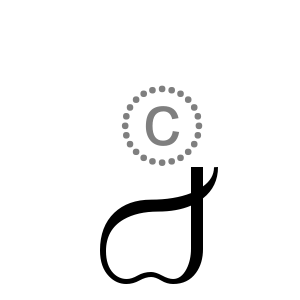
- Aksara pasangan

Usage
- Writing system: Javanese script
- Latin orthography: na
- Sound values: [n]
- In Unicode: A9A4

ꦤ is one of syllable in Javanese script that represent the sound /nɔ/, /na/. It is transliterated to Latin as "na", and sometimes in Indonesian orthography as "no". It has another form (pasangan), which is ◌꧀ꦤ, but represented by a single Unicode code point, U+A9A4.

== Pasangan ==
Its pasangan form ◌꧀ꦤ, is located on the bottom side of the previous syllable. For example, ꦩꦔꦤ꧀ꦤ - mangana (eat, imperative), which, although transliterated with a single 'n', is written using double 'ꦤ' because the root word ('mangan', to eat) ends in 'ꦤ'.

== Murda ==
The letter ꦤ has a murda form, which is ꦟ.

== Glyphs ==
Nglegena forms				Pasangan forms			
ꦤ na	ꦤꦃ nah	ꦤꦁ nang	ꦤꦂ nar	◌꧀ꦤ -na	◌꧀ꦤꦃ -nah	◌꧀ꦤꦁ -nang	◌꧀ꦤꦂ -nar
ꦤꦺ ne	ꦤꦺꦃ neh	ꦤꦺꦁ neng	ꦤꦺꦂ ner	◌꧀ꦤꦺ -ne	◌꧀ꦤꦺꦃ -neh	◌꧀ꦤꦺꦁ -neng	◌꧀ꦤꦺꦂ -ner
ꦤꦼ nê	ꦤꦼꦃ nêh	ꦤꦼꦁ nêng	ꦤꦼꦂ nêr	◌꧀ꦤꦼ -nê	◌꧀ꦤꦼꦃ -nêh	◌꧀ꦤꦼꦁ -nêng	◌꧀ꦤꦼꦂ -nêr
ꦤꦶ ni	ꦤꦶꦃ nih	ꦤꦶꦁ ning	ꦤꦶꦂ nir	◌꧀ꦤꦶ -ni	◌꧀ꦤꦶꦃ -nih	◌꧀ꦤꦶꦁ -ning	◌꧀ꦤꦶꦂ -nir
ꦤꦺꦴ no	ꦤꦺꦴꦃ noh	ꦤꦺꦴꦁ nong	ꦤꦺꦴꦂ nor	◌꧀ꦤꦺꦴ -no	◌꧀ꦤꦺꦴꦃ -noh	◌꧀ꦤꦺꦴꦁ -nong	◌꧀ꦤꦺꦴꦂ -nor
ꦤꦸ nu	ꦤꦸꦃ nuh	ꦤꦸꦁ nung	ꦤꦸꦂ nur	◌꧀ꦤꦸ -nu	◌꧀ꦤꦸꦃ -nuh	◌꧀ꦤꦸꦁ -nung	◌꧀ꦤꦸꦂ -nur
ꦤꦿ nra	ꦤꦿꦃ nrah	ꦤꦿꦁ nrang	ꦤꦿꦂ nrar	◌꧀ꦤꦿ -nra	◌꧀ꦤꦿꦃ -nrah	◌꧀ꦤꦿꦁ -nrang	◌꧀ꦤꦿꦂ -nrar
ꦤꦿꦺ nre	ꦤꦿꦺꦃ nreh	ꦤꦿꦺꦁ nreng	ꦤꦿꦺꦂ nrer	◌꧀ꦤꦿꦺ -nre	◌꧀ꦤꦿꦺꦃ -nreh	◌꧀ꦤꦿꦺꦁ -nreng	◌꧀ꦤꦿꦺꦂ -nrer
ꦤꦽ nrê	ꦤꦽꦃ nrêh	ꦤꦽꦁ nrêng	ꦤꦽꦂ nrêr	◌꧀ꦤꦽ -nrê	◌꧀ꦤꦽꦃ -nrêh	◌꧀ꦤꦽꦁ -nrêng	◌꧀ꦤꦽꦂ -nrêr
ꦤꦿꦶ nri	ꦤꦿꦶꦃ nrih	ꦤꦿꦶꦁ nring	ꦤꦿꦶꦂ nrir	◌꧀ꦤꦿꦶ -nri	◌꧀ꦤꦿꦶꦃ -nrih	◌꧀ꦤꦿꦶꦁ -nring	◌꧀ꦤꦿꦶꦂ -nrir
ꦤꦿꦺꦴ nro	ꦤꦿꦺꦴꦃ nroh	ꦤꦿꦺꦴꦁ nrong	ꦤꦿꦺꦴꦂ nror	◌꧀ꦤꦿꦺꦴ -nro	◌꧀ꦤꦿꦺꦴꦃ -nroh	◌꧀ꦤꦿꦺꦴꦁ -nrong	◌꧀ꦤꦿꦺꦴꦂ -nror
ꦤꦿꦸ nru	ꦤꦿꦸꦃ nruh	ꦤꦿꦸꦁ nrung	ꦤꦿꦸꦂ nrur	◌꧀ꦤꦿꦸ -nru	◌꧀ꦤꦿꦸꦃ -nruh	◌꧀ꦤꦿꦸꦁ -nrung	◌꧀ꦤꦿꦸꦂ -nrur
ꦤꦾ nya	ꦤꦾꦃ nyah	ꦤꦾꦁ nyang	ꦤꦾꦂ nyar	◌꧀ꦤꦾ -nya	◌꧀ꦤꦾꦃ -nyah	◌꧀ꦤꦾꦁ -nyang	◌꧀ꦤꦾꦂ -nyar
ꦤꦾꦺ nye	ꦤꦾꦺꦃ nyeh	ꦤꦾꦺꦁ nyeng	ꦤꦾꦺꦂ nyer	◌꧀ꦤꦾꦺ -nye	◌꧀ꦤꦾꦺꦃ -nyeh	◌꧀ꦤꦾꦺꦁ -nyeng	◌꧀ꦤꦾꦺꦂ -nyer
ꦤꦾꦼ nyê	ꦤꦾꦼꦃ nyêh	ꦤꦾꦼꦁ nyêng	ꦤꦾꦼꦂ nyêr	◌꧀ꦤꦾꦼ -nyê	◌꧀ꦤꦾꦼꦃ -nyêh	◌꧀ꦤꦾꦼꦁ -nyêng	◌꧀ꦤꦾꦼꦂ -nyêr
ꦤꦾꦶ nyi	ꦤꦾꦶꦃ nyih	ꦤꦾꦶꦁ nying	ꦤꦾꦶꦂ nyir	◌꧀ꦤꦾꦶ -nyi	◌꧀ꦤꦾꦶꦃ -nyih	◌꧀ꦤꦾꦶꦁ -nying	◌꧀ꦤꦾꦶꦂ -nyir
ꦤꦾꦺꦴ nyo	ꦤꦾꦺꦴꦃ nyoh	ꦤꦾꦺꦴꦁ nyong	ꦤꦾꦺꦴꦂ nyor	◌꧀ꦤꦾꦺꦴ -nyo	◌꧀ꦤꦾꦺꦴꦃ -nyoh	◌꧀ꦤꦾꦺꦴꦁ -nyong	◌꧀ꦤꦾꦺꦴꦂ -nyor
ꦤꦾꦸ nyu	ꦤꦾꦸꦃ nyuh	ꦤꦾꦸꦁ nyung	ꦤꦾꦸꦂ nyur	◌꧀ꦤꦾꦸ -nyu	◌꧀ꦤꦾꦸꦃ -nyuh	◌꧀ꦤꦾꦸꦁ -nyung	◌꧀ꦤꦾꦸꦂ -nyur

== Unicode block ==
Javanese script was added to the Unicode Standard in October, 2009 with the release of version 5.2.

Javanese^{[1]}^{[2]} Official Unicode Consortium code chart (PDF)
	0	1	2	3	4	5	6	7	8	9	A	B	C	D	E	F
U+A98x	ꦀ	ꦁ	ꦂ	ꦃ	ꦄ	ꦅ	ꦆ	ꦇ	ꦈ	ꦉ	ꦊ	ꦋ	ꦌ	ꦍ	ꦎ	ꦏ
U+A99x	ꦐ	ꦑ	ꦒ	ꦓ	ꦔ	ꦕ	ꦖ	ꦗ	ꦘ	ꦙ	ꦚ	ꦛ	ꦜ	ꦝ	ꦞ	ꦟ
U+A9Ax	ꦠ	ꦡ	ꦢ	ꦣ	ꦤ	ꦥ	ꦦ	ꦧ	ꦨ	ꦩ	ꦪ	ꦫ	ꦬ	ꦭ	ꦮ	ꦯ
U+A9Bx	ꦰ	ꦱ	ꦲ	꦳	ꦴ	ꦵ	ꦶ	ꦷ	ꦸ	ꦹ	ꦺ	ꦻ	ꦼ	ꦽ	ꦾ	ꦿ
U+A9Cx	꧀	꧁	꧂	꧃	꧄	꧅	꧆	꧇	꧈	꧉	꧊	꧋	꧌	꧍		ꧏ
U+A9Dx	꧐	꧑	꧒	꧓	꧔	꧕	꧖	꧗	꧘	꧙					꧞	꧟
Notes 1.As of Unicode version 17.0 2.Grey areas indicate non-assigned code points
