= Na Na Na =

Na Na Na or Nanana may refer to:

== Songs ==
=== So titled ===
- "Na Na Na (Dulce Niña)", a song by Mexican-American cumbia group A.B. Quintanilla y Los Kumbia Kings
- "Nanana" (The Kelly Family song), 1997
- "Na Na Na (Na Na Na Na Na Na Na Na Na)", a song by American rock band My Chemical Romance
- "(It Goes Like) Nanana", a 2023 single by Peggy Gou
- "Right Now (Na Na Na)", the lead single from Akon's third studio album, Freedom
- "Nanana" (Karmen Stavec song), the Slovene entry to the Eurovision Song Contest 2003
- Say Na Na Na, the San Marino Entry to the Eurovision Song Contest 2019
- "Na Na Na", a 1967 single by The Shoes
- "Na Na Na", a 1974 single by Cozy Powell
- "Na Na Na", the fourth track from Tiffany's 2005 album Dust Off and Dance
- "Na Na Na", the 17th track from One Direction's 2011 album Up All Night
- "Na Na Na", the 15th track from Big Time Rush's 2013 album 24/Seven
- "Na Na Na", the first track from Pentatonix's 2015 album Pentatonix
- "NaNaNa", the second track from Ayumi Hamasaki's 2012 album Party Queen
- Three tracks from Status Quo's 1971 album Dog of Two Head

=== Similar ===
- "Na Na Na Na", first single from 112's 2003 album, Hot & Wet
- "Na Na Nana Na Na", a 2009 single by Jim Jones
- "Na-NaNa-Na", a 2005 single by Nelly from his album Sweat
- "Nah Neh Nah", a song by Belgian band Vaya Con Dios
- "Na Na Hey Hey Kiss Him Goodbye", a song written and recorded by Paul Leka, Gary DeCarlo and Dale Frashuer

== See also ==
- Batman Theme from the 1966 television series Batman, which features the lyrics "Na-na-na-na-na-na-na-na Batman"
- "Hey Jude", a song by the English rock band the Beatles featuring a coda featuring a "Na-na-na na" refrain
- "Land of a Thousand Dances", a song written and first recorded by Chris Kenner famous for its "na na na na na" hook
  - "Here Comes the Hotstepper", a song by Jamaican dancehall artist Ini Kamoze which interpolates the chorus from Land of a Thousand Dances
- Non-lexical vocables in music
- Na (disambiguation)
- Na Na (disambiguation)
