= Javanese script =

Writing system used for several Austronesian languages

Javanese script ꦲꦏ꧀ꦱꦫꦗꦮ
- Script type: Abugida
- Period: c. 1500s CE – present
- Direction: Left-to-right
- Languages: Javanese; Sundanese; Madurese; Sasak; Malay; Indonesian; Kawi; Sanskrit

Related scripts
- Parent systems: Egyptian hieroglyphs: Proto-Sinaitic; Phoenician; Aramaic (debated); Brahmi; Tamil-Brahmi; Pallava; Kawi; Javanese script
- Sister systems: Balinese script Batak script Baybayin scripts Lontara script Makasar; Sundanese script Rencong alphabet Rejang alphabet Sasak script

ISO 15924
- ISO 15924: Java (361), Javanese

Unicode
- Unicode alias: Javanese
- Unicode range: U+A980–U+A9DF

Part of a series on

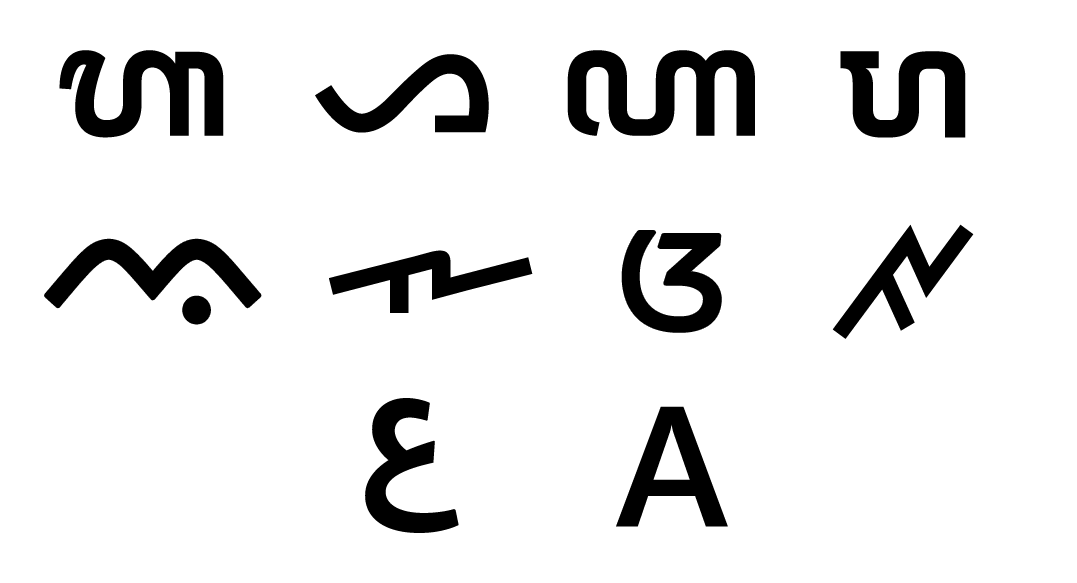

Writing systems used in Indonesia
Abugida (Brahmic)
- Balinese
- Batak
- Buda
- Javanese
- Kawi
- Lontara (Satera Jontal, Mbojo)
- Makasar
- Sasak
- Sundanese (Old Sundanese)
- Ulu (Incung, Komering, Lampung, Lembak,
- Ogan, Pasemah, Rejang, Serawai)
Abjad
- Buri Wolio
- Jawi
- Jawoe
- Pegon
Alphabet
- Latin (Van Ophuijsen, Suwandi, EYD)
Others
- Alifuru
- Bonda
- Cia-Cia
- Bilang-bilang
- Dunging
Related
- List of writing systems of Indonesia
- Languages of Indonesia

Javanese script (Javanese: ꦲꦏ꧀ꦱꦫꦗꦮ, romanized: aksara Jawa), also known as hanacaraka, carakan, and dentawyanjana, is one of Indonesia's traditional scripts developed on the island of Java. The script is primarily used to write the Javanese language and has also been used to write several other regional languages such as Sundanese and Madurese, the regional lingua franca Malay, as well as the historical languages Kawi and Sanskrit. It heavily influenced the Balinese script from which the writing system for Sasak developed. Javanese script was actively used by the Javanese people for writing day-to-day and literary texts from at least the mid-16th century CE until the mid-20th century CE, before it was gradually supplanted by the Latin alphabet. Today, the script is taught in the Yogyakarta Special Region as well as the provinces of Central Java and East Java as part of the local curriculum, but with very limited function in everyday use.

Javanese script is an abugida writing system which consists of 20 to 33 basic letters, depending on the language being written. Like other Brahmic scripts, each letter (called an aksara) represents a syllable with the inherent vowel /a/ or /ɔ/ which can be changed with the placement of diacritics around the letter. Each letter has a conjunct form called pasangan, which nullifies the inherent vowel of the previous letter. Traditionally, the script is written without spaces between words (scriptio continua) but is interspersed with a group of decorative punctuation.

== History ==
Javanese script's evolutionary history can be traced fairly well because significant amounts of inscriptional evidence left behind allowed for epigraphical studies to be carried out. The oldest root of Javanese script is the Tamil-Brahmi script which evolved into the Pallava script in Southern and Southeast Asia between the 6th and 8th centuries. The Pallava script, in turn, evolved into Kawi script, which was actively used throughout Indonesia's Hindu-Buddhist period between the 8th and 15th centuries. In various parts of Indonesia, Kawi script would then evolve into Indonesia's various traditional scripts, one of them being Javanese script. The modern Javanese script seen today evolved from Kawi script between the 14th and 15th centuries, a period in which Java began to receive significant Islamic influence.

From the 15th until the mid-20th centuries, Javanese script was actively used by the Javanese people for writing day-to-day and literary texts spanning a wide range of themes. Javanese script was used throughout the island at a time when there was no easy means of communication between remote areas and no impulse towards standardization. As a result, there is a huge variety of historical and local styles of Javanese writing throughout the ages. The great differences between regional styles make the "Javanese script" appear like a family of scripts. Javanese writing traditions were especially cultivated in the Kraton environment in Javanese cultural centers, such as Yogyakarta and Surakarta. However, Javanese texts are known to be made and used by various layers of society with varying usage intensities between regions. In West Java, for example, the script was mainly used by the Sundanese nobility (ménak) due to the political influence of the Mataram kingdom. However, most Sundanese people within the same time period more commonly used the Pegon script which was adapted from the Arabic alphabet. Javanese writing tradition also relied on periodic copying due to the deterioration of writing materials in the tropical Javanese climate; as a result, many physical manuscripts that are available now are 18th or 19th century copies, though their contents can usually be traced to far older prototypes.

== Media ==
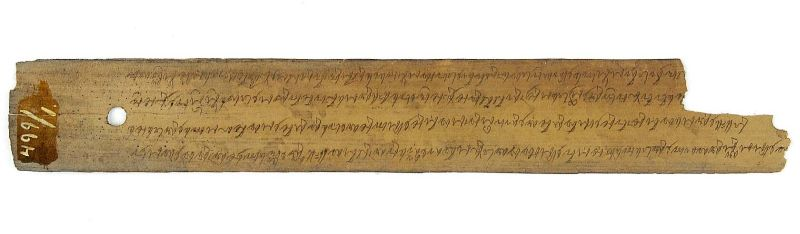
Serat Yusuf in palm leaf (lontar) form, Tropenmuseum collection

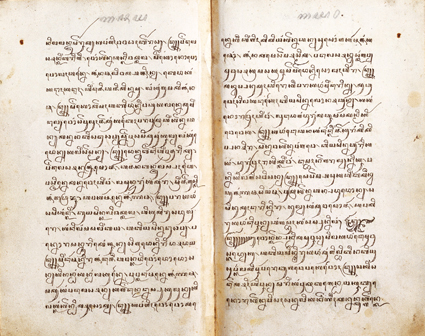
Serat Yusuf in paper codex form, Sonobudoyo Museum collection

Javanese script has been written with numerous media that have shifted over time. Kawi script, which is ancestral to Javanese script, is often found on stone inscriptions and copper plates. Everyday writing in Kawi was done in palm leaf form (locally known as lontar), which are processed leaves of the tal palm (Borassus flabellifer). Each lontar leaf has the shape of a slim rectangle 2.8 to 4 cm in width and varies in length between 20 and 80 cm. Each leaf can only accommodate around 4 lines of writing, which are incised horizontally with a small knife and then blackened with soot to increase readability. This media has a long history of attested use all over South and Southeast Asia.

In the 13th century, paper began to be used in the Malay Archipelago. As Java began to receive significant Islamic influence in the 15th century, coinciding with the period in which Kawi script began to transition into the modern Javanese script, paper became widespread in Java while the use of lontar only persisted in a few regions. There are two kinds of paper that are commonly used in Javanese manuscript: locally produced paper called daluang, and imported paper. Daluang (also spelled dluwang) is a paper made from the beaten bark of the saéh tree (Broussonetia papyrifera). Visually, daluang can be easily differentiated from regular paper by its distinctive brown tint and fibrous appearance. A well made daluang has a smooth surface and is quite durable against manuscript damage commonly associated with tropical climates, especially insect damage. Meanwhile, a coarse daluang has a bumpy surface and tends to break easily. Daluang is commonly used in manuscripts produced by Javanese kraton (palaces) and pesantren (Islamic boarding schools) between the 16th and 17th centuries.

Most imported paper in Indonesian manuscripts came from Europe. In the beginning, only a few scribes were able to use European paper due to its high price—paper made using European methods at the time could only be imported in limited numbers. (Note: VOC established a paper mill in Java between 1665–1681. However, the mill was not able to fulfill paper demands of the island and so stable paper supply continued to rely in shipments from Europe.) In colonial administration, the use of European paper had to be supplemented with Javanese daluang and imported Chinese paper until at least the 19th century. As the paper supply increased due to growing imports from Europe, scribes in palaces and urban settlements gradually opted to use European paper as the primary medium for writing, while daluang paper was increasingly associated with pesantren and rural manuscripts. Alongside the increase of European paper supply, attempts to create Javanese printing type began, spearheaded by several European figures. With the establishment of printing technology in 1825, materials in Javanese script could be mass-produced and became increasingly common in various aspects of pre-independence Javanese life, from letters, books, and newspapers, to magazines, and even advertisements and paper currency.

== Usage ==
Details of Serat Selarasa manuscript copied in Surabaya, 1804. The two leftmost figures can be seen reciting a text.

From the 15th century until the mid-20th century, Javanese script was used by all layers of Javanese society for writing day-to-day and literary texts with a wide range of theme and content. Due to the significant influence of oral tradition, reading in pre-independence Javanese society was usually a performance; Javanese literature texts are almost always composed in metrical verses that are designed to be recited, thus Javanese texts are not only judged by their content and language, but also by the merit of their melody and rhythm during recitation sessions. Javanese poets are not expected to create new stories and characters; instead the role of the poet is to rewrite and recompose existing stories into forms that cater to local taste and prevailing trends. As a result, Javanese literary works such as the Panji tales do not have a single authoritative version referenced by all others; instead, the Cerita Panji is a loose collection of numerous tales with various versions bound together by the common thread of the Panji character. Literature genres with the longest attested history are Sanskrit epics such as the Ramayana and the Mahabharata, which have been recomposed since the Kawi period and introduced hundreds of familiar characters in Javanese wayang stories today, including Arjuna, Srikandi, Ghatotkacha and many others. Since the introduction of Islam, characters of Middle-Eastern provenance such as Amir Hamzah and the Prophet Joseph have also been frequent subjects of writing. There are also local characters, usually set in Java's semi-legendary past, such as Prince Panji, Damar Wulan, and Calon Arang.

When studies of Javanese language and literature began to attract European attention in the 19th century, an initiative to create a Javanese movable type began to take place in order to mass-produce and quickly disseminate Javanese literary materials. One of the earliest attempts to create a movable Javanese type was by Paul van Vlissingen. His typeface was first put in use in the Bataviasche Courant newspaper's October 1825 issue. While lauded as a considerable technical achievement, many at the time felt that Vlissingen's design was a coarse copy of the fine Javanese hand used in literary texts, and so this early attempt was further developed by numerous other people to varying degrees of success as the study of Javanese developed over the years. In 1838, Taco Roorda completed his typeface, known as Tuladha Jejeg, based on the hand of Surakartan scribes (Note: Among 19th century European scholars, the style of the Surakartan scribes is agreed as the most refined among the various regional Javanese hand. So much so that prominent Javanese scholars such as J.F.C. Gericke frequently suggested that the Surakartan style should be used as the ideal shape to which a proper Javanese type design could be based upon.) with some European typographical elements mixed in. Roorda's font garnered positive feedback and soon became the main choice to print any Javanese text. From then, reading materials in printed Javanese using Roorda's typeface became widespread among the Javanese populace and were widely used in materials other than literature. The establishment of print technology gave rise to a printing industry which, for the next century, produced various materials in printed Javanese, from administrative papers and school books, to mass media such as the Kajawèn magazine which was entirely printed in Javanese in all of its articles and columns. Javanese script was part of the multilingual legal text on the Netherlands Indies gulden banknotes circulated by the Bank of Java.

Some examples of use

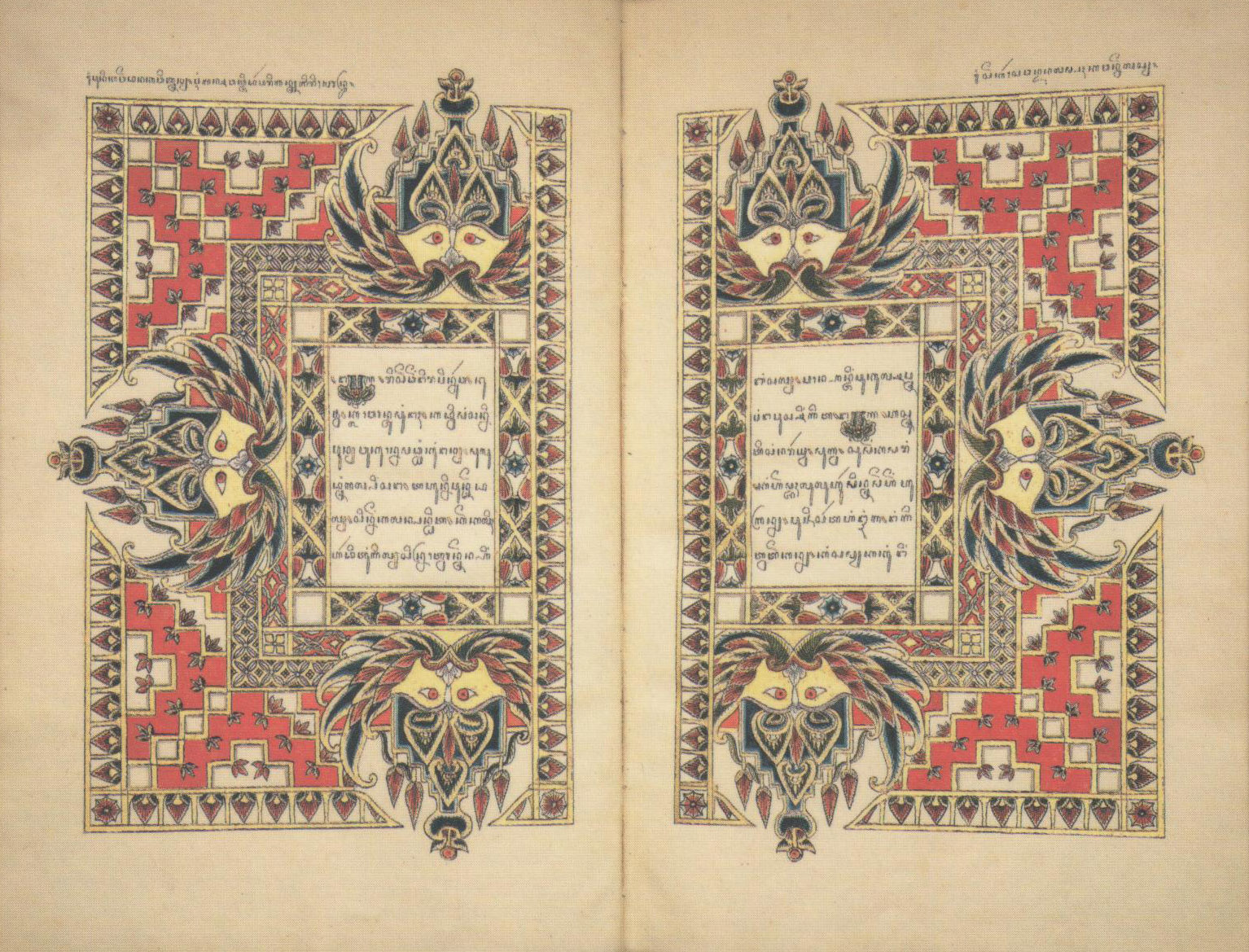
Opening pages of Serat Jatipustaka copied in 1830, Denver Museum collection

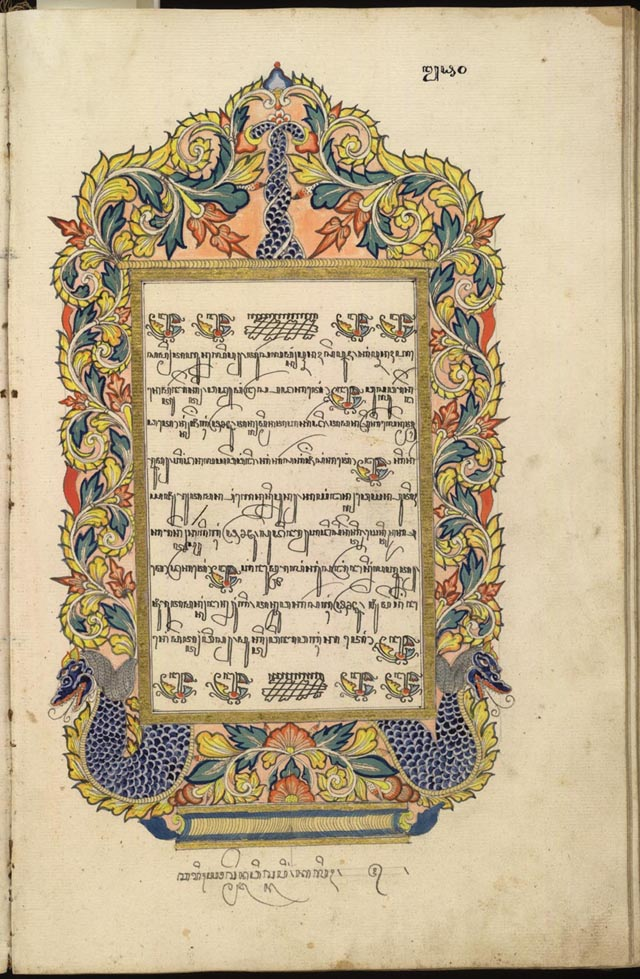
Opening page of Babad Tanah Jawi copied in 1862, Library of Congress collection

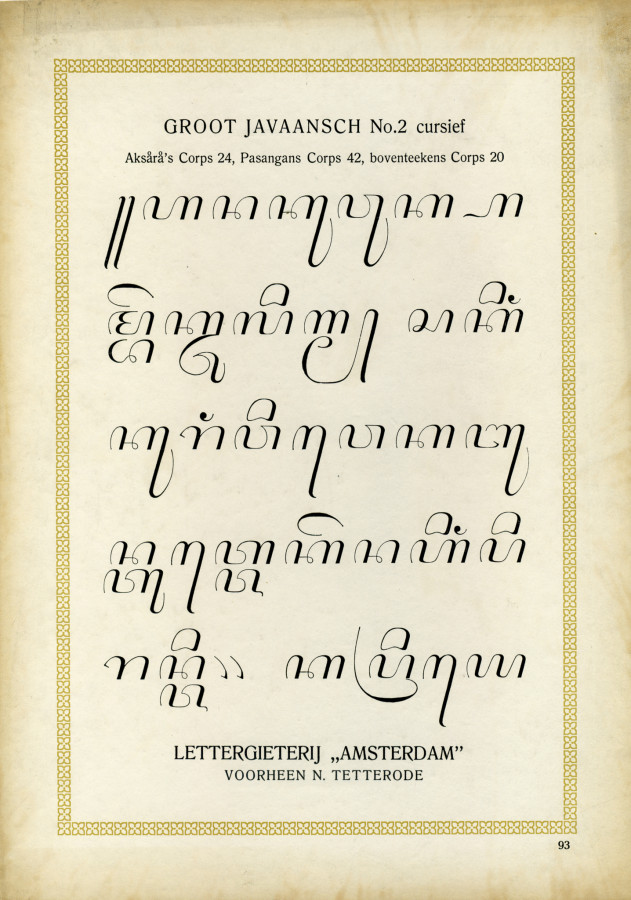
A Javanese type sample from the Amsterdam type foundry, 1910

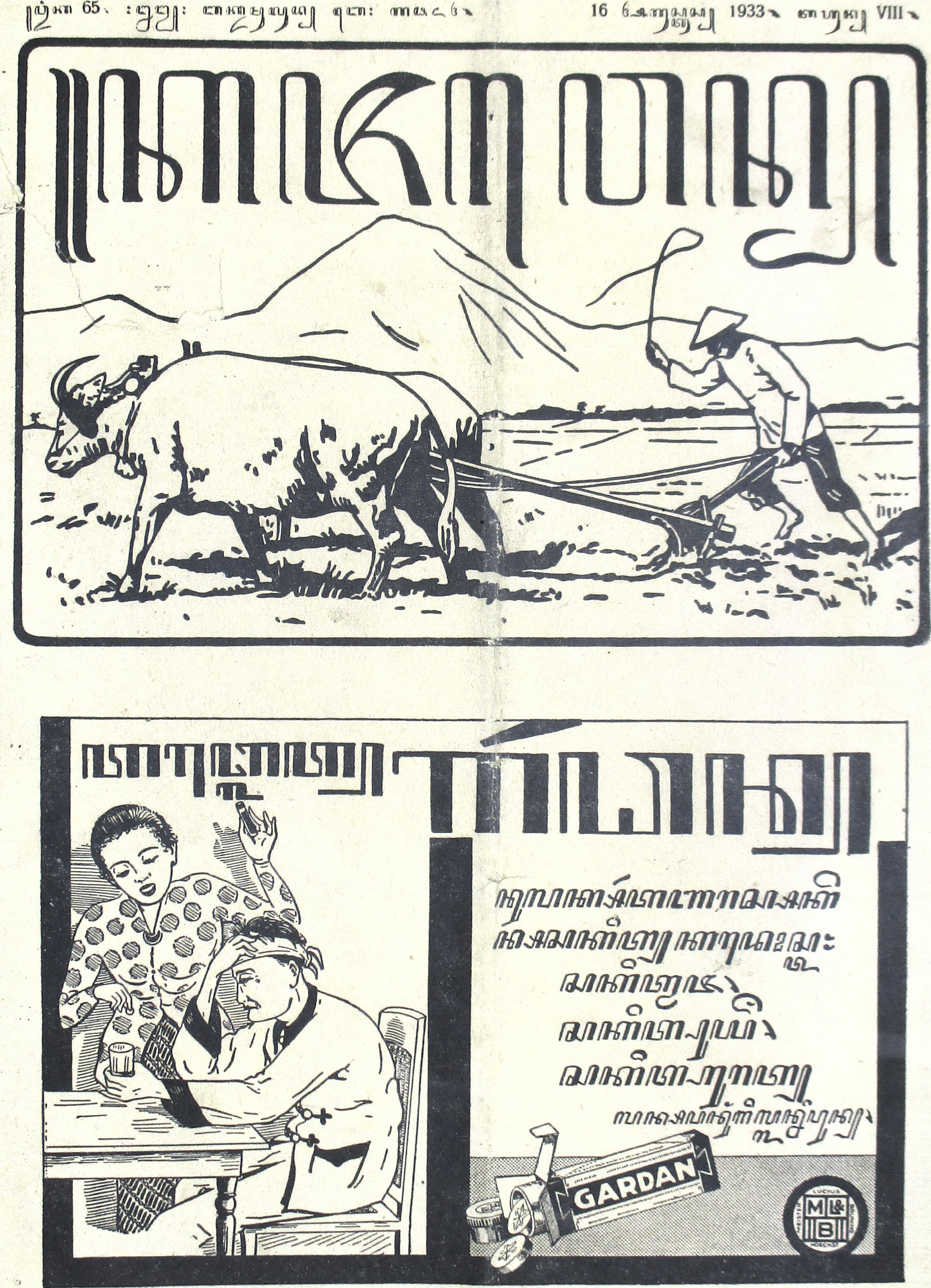
Cover of Kajawèn magazine, issue 65, 16 August 1933

Serat kekancingan, a document issued by the Kraton of Yogyakarta in 1935, Dewantara Kirti Griya Museum collection

Serat Babad Tuban published by Tan Khoen Swie in 1936

=== Decline ===
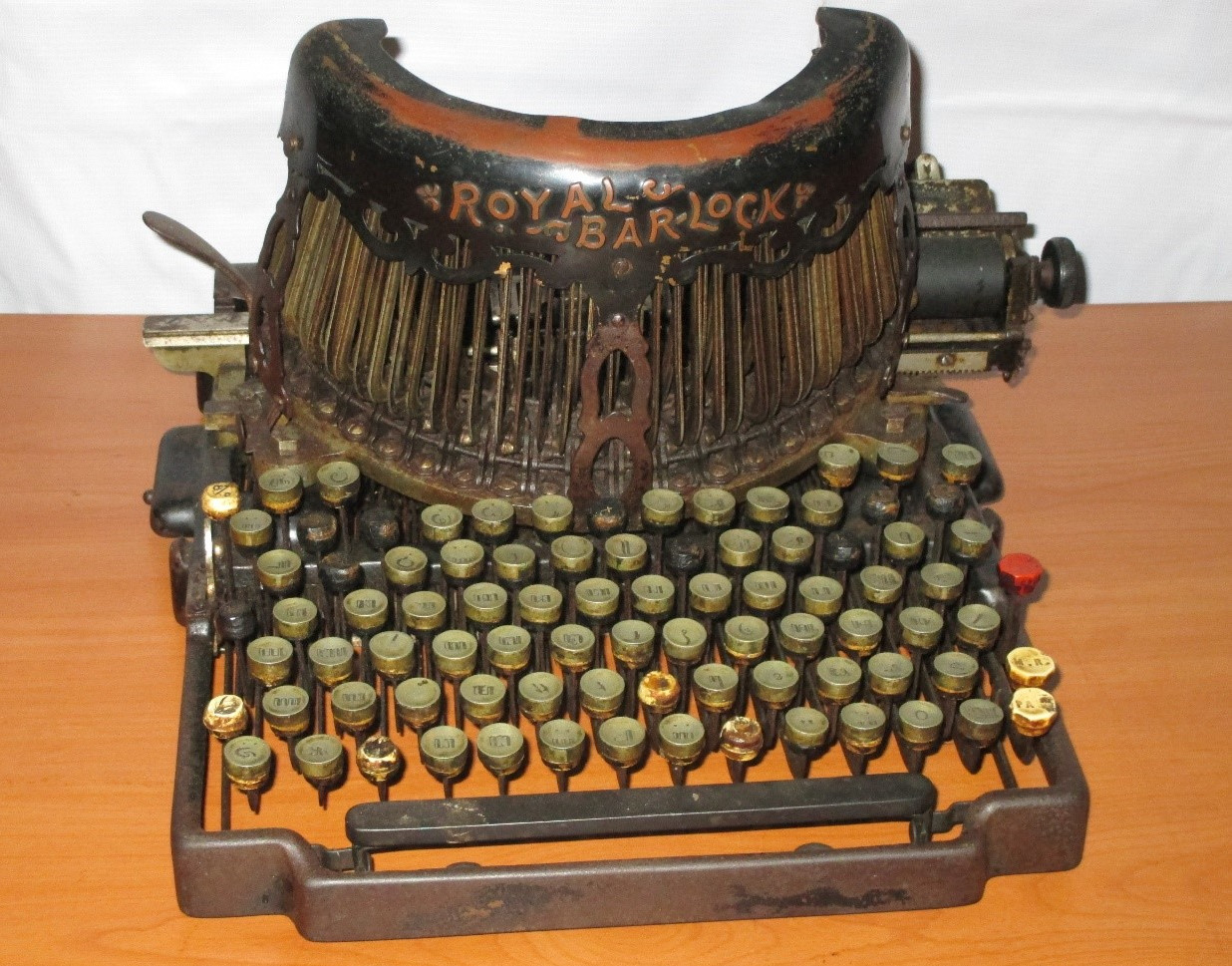
A Javanese script typewriter that was once used by Keraton Surakarta from 1917 to 1960 for correspondence, issuing decrees, and announcements.

As literacy rates and the demand for reading materials increased at the beginning of the 20th century, Javanese publishers paradoxically began to decrease the amount of Javanese script publication due to a practical and economic consideration: printing any text in Javanese script at the time required twice the amount of paper compared to the same text rendered in the Latin alphabet, making Javanese texts more expensive and time-consuming to produce. In order to lower production costs and keep book prices affordable to the general populace, many publishers gradually prioritized publications in the Latin alphabet. (Note: According to D. A. Rinkes, the director of the government-owned Balai Pustaka, writing in 1920, "[using Roman type] considerably simplifies matters for European users, and for interested Natives presents no difficulty at all, seeing that the Javanese language... can be rendered no less clearly in roman type than in the Javanese script. In this way the costs are about one third of printing in Javanese characters, seeing that printing in that type, which furthermore is not readily available, is one and a half times to twice as expensive (and more time-consuming) than in roman type, also because it cannot be set on a setting-machine, and one page of Javanese type only contains about half the number of words on one page of the same text in roman script.") However, the Javanese population at the time maintained the use of Javanese script in various aspects of everyday life. It was, for example, considered more polite to write a letter using Javanese script, especially one addressed toward an elder or superior. Many publishers, including Balai Pustaka, continued to print books, newspapers, and magazines in Javanese script due to sufficient, albeit declining, demand. The use of Javanese script only started to drop significantly during the Japanese occupation of the Dutch East Indies beginning in 1942. Some writers attribute this sudden decline to prohibitions issued by the Japanese government banning the use of native script in the public sphere, though no documentary evidence of such a ban has yet been found. Nevertheless, the use of Javanese script did decline significantly during the Japanese occupation and it never recovered its previous widespread use in post-independence Indonesia.

=== Contemporary use ===
Comparison of Javanese script styles for government institution nameplates.

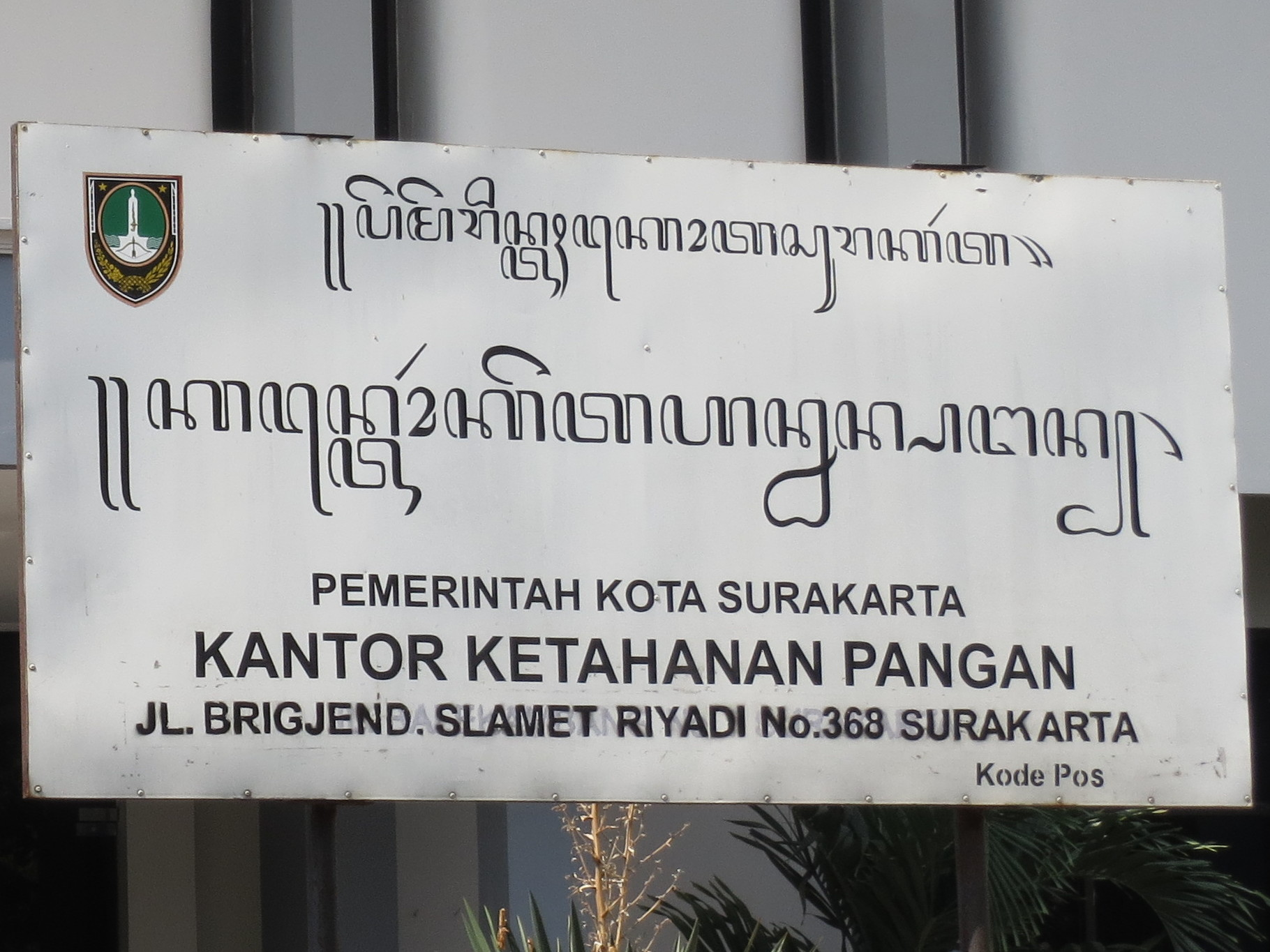
Surakarta-style: Javanese script is placed above Latin letters (Perwali Solo No. 3/2008).

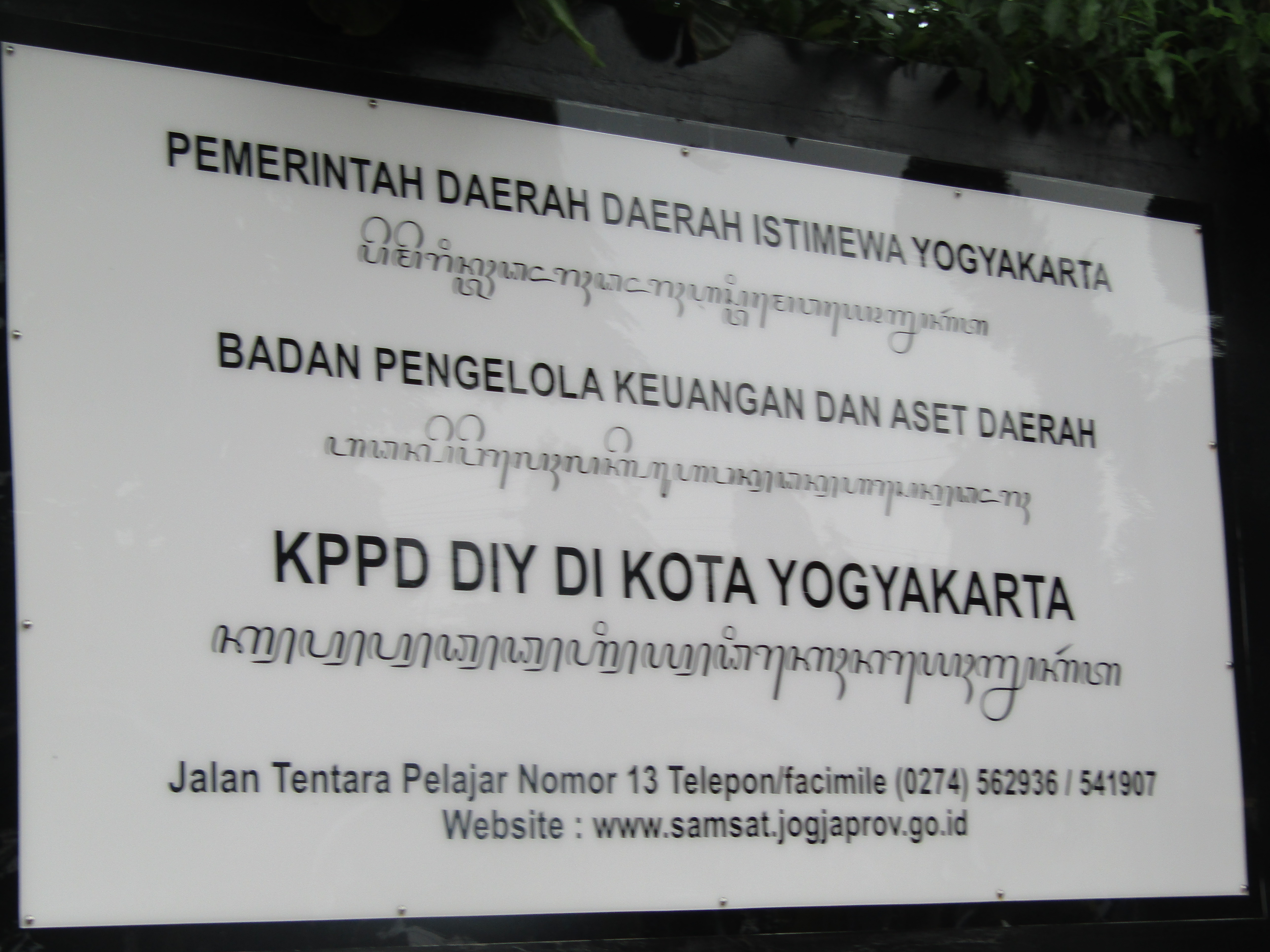
Yogyakarta-style: Latin letters are placed above Javanese script (Pergub DIY No.70/2009)

In contemporary usage, Javanese script is still taught as part of the local curriculum in Yogyakarta, Central Java, and the East Java Province. Several local newspapers and magazines have columns written in Javanese script, and the script can frequently be seen on public signage. However, many contemporary attempts to revive Javanese script are symbolic rather than functional; there are no longer, for example, periodicals like the Kajawèn magazine that publish significant content in Javanese script. Most Javanese people today know the existence of the script and recognize a few letters, but it is rare to find someone who can read and write it meaningfully. Therefore, as recently as 2019, it is not uncommon to see Javanese script signage in public places with numerous misspellings and basic mistakes. Several hurdles in revitalizing the use of Javanese script includes information technology equipment that does not support correct rendering of Javanese script, lack of governing bodies with sufficient competence to consult on its usage, and lack of typographical explorations that may intrigue contemporary viewers. Nevertheless, attempts to revive the script are still being conducted by several communities and public figures who encourage the use of Javanese script in the public sphere, especially with digital devices.

== Letters ==
=== Aksara ===
Aksara are base letters that represent a single syllable. Javanese script has approximately 45 base aksara (letters), but not all of them are equally used. Over time, some aksara have fallen out of use, while others are only employed in specific contexts. Therefore, the aksara in Javanese script are classified into several types based on their function and usage.

==== Wyanjana ====
Aksara wyanjana (ꦲꦏ꧀ꦱꦫꦮꦾꦚ꧀ꦗꦤ) are consonants with an inherent vowel sound of /a/ or /ɔ/. As a descendant of the Brahmi script, Javanese script originally had 33 wyanjana characters to write the 33 consonant sounds used in Sanskrit and Kawi. Their forms can be seen as follows:

Aksara wyanjana
	Unvoiced		Voiced		Nasal	Semivowel	Sibilant	Fricative
	Unaspirated	Aspirated	Unaspirated	Aspirated	Nasal	Semivowel	Sibilant	Fricative
Velar	ꦏ ka	ꦑ kha	ꦒ ga	ꦓ gha	ꦔ ṅa			ꦲ ha/a (Note: may represent /ha/ or /a/ in Kawi)
Palatal	ꦕ ca	ꦖ cha	ꦗ ja	ꦙ jha	ꦚ ña (Note: is romanized as n in the consonant clusters nc ꦚ꧀ꦕ and nj ꦚ꧀ꦗ)	ꦪ ya	ꦯ śa	
Retroflex	ꦛ ṭa	ꦜ ṭha	ꦝ ḍa	ꦞ ḍha	ꦟ ṇa	ꦫ ra	ꦰ ṣa	
Dental	ꦠ ta	ꦡ tha	ꦢ da	ꦣ dha	ꦤ na	ꦭ la	ꦱ sa	
Labial	ꦥ pa	ꦦ pha	ꦧ ba	ꦨ bha	ꦩ ma	ꦮ wa		

=== Aksara nglĕgĕna ===
Modern Javanese only uses 20 consonant sounds, represented by 20 of the original 33 aksara wyanjana, which are then referred to as ꦲꦏ꧀ꦱꦫ ꦔ꧀ꦭꦼꦒꦼꦤ, aksara nglĕgĕna. They are commonly arranged in the hanacaraka sequence, a pangram whose name is derived from its first five letters, similar to the word "alphabet" which comes from the first two letters of the Greek alphabet, alpha and beta. This sequence has been used since at least the 15th century, when the island of Java started to receive significant Islamic influence. There are numerous interpretations on the supposed philosophical and esoteric qualities of the hanacaraka sequence, and it is often linked to the myth of Aji Saka.

Hana caraka (modern sequence)
ꦲ ha	ꦤ na	ꦕ ca	ꦫ ra	ꦏ ka	Javanese: ꦲꦤꦕꦫꦏ, romanized: hana caraka, lit. 'There were (two) emissaries.'
ꦢ da	ꦠ ta	ꦱ sa	ꦮ wa	ꦭ la	Javanese: ꦢꦠꦱꦮꦭ, romanized: data sawala, lit. 'They began to fight.'
ꦥ pa	ꦝ ḍa	ꦗ ja	ꦪ ya	ꦚ ña	Javanese: ꦥꦝꦗꦪꦚ, romanized: padha jayanya, lit. 'Their valor was equal'
ꦩ ma	ꦒ ga	ꦧ ba	ꦛ ṭa	ꦔ ṅa	Javanese: ꦩꦒꦧꦛꦔ, romanized: maga bathanga, lit. 'They both fell dead.'

=== Aksara murda ===
Some of the remaining characters were repurposed as ꦲꦏ꧀ꦱꦫꦩꦸꦂꦢ, aksara murda. Aksara murda are used to write the names of both respected individuals and legendary figures (for example Javanese: ꦨꦶꦩ, romanized: Bima) and real individuals. The use of murda differs from the use of capital letters in Latin script, in that not every letter has a corresponding murda and if there is no murda for the first syllable of a name, a murda form can be used for whichever succeeding syllable does one. A name of great respect can be written entirely in murda. In traditional writing, the application of murda was essentially optional and not consistent. So, a name like Gani could be written as ꦒꦤꦶ (without murda), ꦓꦤꦶ (with murda at the beginning), or ꦓꦟꦶ (entirely in murda). The remaining characters that are not included in nglegena or murda are mahaprana characters. Mahaprana characters have no function in modern Javanese writing and are only used in writing Sanskrit-Kawi.

Aksara murda
Aksara murda	ꦟ na	ꦖ ca	ꦬ ra (Note: not as widely known as other murda letters.)	ꦑ ka	ꦡ ta	ꦯ sa	ꦦ pa	ꦘ nya	ꦓ ga	ꦨ ba

=== Additional letters in loan words ===
The Javanese script includes additional letters (Javanese: ꦲꦏ꧀ꦱꦫ ꦫꦺꦏꦤ꧀, romanized: aksara rékan used to write foreign sounds. Initially developed to transcribe loanwords from Arabic, they were later adapted for loanwords from Dutch, and in contemporary use, they are also used to write words from Indonesian and English. Most rékan characters are formed by adding the cecak telu diacritic to the character whose sound is considered closest to the foreign sound. For example, the rékan character fa (ꦥ꦳) is formed by adding the cecak telu to the wyanjana character pa (ꦥ). The combination of wyanjana and the foreign sound equivalent for each rékan may vary among writers due to the lack of a unified standard. According to Padmasusastra and Dwijasewaya, there are five rékan characters: kha, dza, fa, za, and gha. However, according to Hollander, there are nine.

Aksara rékan
Javanese	ḥa ꦲ꦳	kha ꦏ꦳	qa ꦐ (Note: ka Sasak was originally used only in the writing of the Sasak language)	dza ꦢ꦳	sya ꦱ꦳	fa/va ꦥ꦳	za ꦗ꦳	gha ꦒ꦳	ʾa ꦔ꦳
Arabic	ح	خ	ق	ذ	ش	ف	ز	غ	ع

=== Diacritics ===
Diacritics (sandhangan ꦱꦤ꧀ꦝꦔꦤ꧀) are marks attached to characters to modify the inherent vowel of the respective character. Similar to the characters themselves, Javanese diacritics can also be divided into several groups depending on their function and usage.

=== Vowels ===
Aksara swara (ꦲꦏ꧀ꦱꦫꦱ꧀ꦮꦫ) are characters used to write independent vowels. Javanese script has 14 vowel characters inherited from the Sanskrit writing tradition. Modern Javanese no longer uses the entire set of swara, so now only the short vowel characters are generally taught. In modern writing, aksara swara is used to replace the aksara wyanjana ha ꦲ (whose pronunciation can be ambiguous as it serves a dual function as the phoneme /ha/ and /a/) in foreign names or terms whose pronunciation needs clarification.

Sandhangan swara (ꦱꦤ꧀ꦝꦁꦔꦤ꧀ꦱ꧀ꦮꦫ) are diacritics used to change a consonant's inherent vowel /a/ to other vowels, as shown below:

Aksara swara with their sandhangan swara and examples with ⟨ꦲ and ꦏ⟩
Short						Long					
ꦄ IPA: /a/	ꦆ IPA: /i/	ꦈ IPA: /u/	ꦌ IPA: /e/	ꦎ IPA: /o/		ꦄꦴ IPA: /aː/	ꦇ IPA: /iː/	ꦈꦴ IPA: /uː/	ꦍ IPA: /aj/	ꦎꦴ IPA: /au/	
-	wulu ꦶ	suku ꦸ	taling ꦺ	taling-tarung ꦺꦴ	pepet ꦼ	tarung ꦴ	wulu melik ꦷ	suku mendut ꦹ	dirga muré ꦻ	dirga muré-tarung ꦻꦴ	pepet-tarung ꦼꦴ
ꦲ a	ꦲꦶ i	ꦲꦸ u	ꦲꦺ é	ꦲꦺꦴ o	ꦲꦼ e	ꦲꦴ ā	ꦲꦷ ī	ꦲꦹ ū	ꦲꦻ ai	ꦲꦻꦴ au	ꦲꦼꦴ eu
ꦏ ka	ꦏꦶ ki	ꦏꦸ ku	ꦏꦺ ké	ꦏꦺꦴ ko	ꦏꦼ ke	ꦏꦴ kā	ꦏꦷ kī	ꦏꦹ kū	ꦏꦻ kai	ꦏꦻꦴ kau	ꦏꦼꦴ keu

Just like aksara swara, only short vowel diacritics are generally taught and used in contemporary Javanese, while long vowel diacritics are used in writing Sanskrit and Kawi.

Pa cerek ꦉ, pa cerek dirgha ꦉꦴ, nga lelet ꦊ, and nga lelet raswadi ꦋ are syllabic consonants that are considered vowels in Sanskrit-Kawi. When used in languages other than Sanskrit, the pronunciation of these four characters often varies. In modern Javanese, only pa cerek is pronounced /rə/ and nga lelet is pronounced /lə/. In modern teaching, these characters are often separated from aksara swara and known as aksara gantèn (replacement characters). They are used to replace every combination of ra + pepet (ꦫꦼ → ꦉ) and la + pepet (ꦭꦼ → ꦊ). Pa cerek dirgha and nga lelet raswadi are not used in modern Javanese.

==== Panyigeging wanda ====
Diacritics (Javanese: ꦱꦤ꧀ꦝꦁꦔꦤ꧀ꦥꦚꦶꦒꦼꦒꦶꦁꦮꦤ꧀ꦢ, romanized: sandhangan panyigeging vanda) are used to close a syllable with a consonant.

Panyigeging wanda
panyangga ꦀ nasal (Note: usually used in transcription of Balinese lontars for writing the sacred syllable ong ꦎꦀ)	cecek ꦁ -ng	layar ꦂ -r	wignyan ꦃ -h	pangkon ꧀ (Note: used in final syllables, but not in the middle of a word.)
ꦏꦀ kam	ꦏꦁ kang	ꦏꦂ kar	ꦏꦃ kah	ꦏ꧀ k

=== Semivowels and their diacritics ===
Consonant clusters containing a semivowel are written by adding a diacritic (Javanese: ꦱꦤ꧀ꦝꦁꦔꦤ꧀ꦮꦾꦚ꧀ꦗꦤ, romanized: sandhangan wyanjana) to the base syllable.

Sandhangan wyanjana
keret ꦽ -re-	pèngkal ꦾ -y-	cakra ꦿ -r-	panjingan la ꧀ꦭ -l-	gembung ꧀ꦮ -w-
ꦏꦽ kre	ꦏꦾ kya	ꦏꦿ kra	ꦏ꧀ꦭ kla	ꦏ꧀ꦮ kwa

==== Pasangan ====
The inherent vowel of each base character can be nullified using the diacritic pangkon. However, the pangkon is generally not used in the middle of words or sentences. Instead, to write a closed syllable in the middle of a word or sentence, the pasangan form (ꦥꦱꦔꦤ꧀) is used. Unlike the pangkon, the pasangan not only nullifies the preceding consonant but also indicates the subsequent consonant. For example, the character ma (ꦩ) followed by the pasangan form of pa (꧀ꦥ) becomes mpa (ꦩ꧀ꦥ). The pasangan forms in this table are those used in modern Javanese writing. Some characters have different pasangan forms in Sanskrit-Kawi writing.

Pasangan
ha/a	na	ca	ra	ka	da	ta	sa	wa	la	pa	dha	ja	ya	nya	ma	ga	ba	tha	nga
꧀ꦲ	꧀ꦤ	꧀ꦕ	꧀ꦫ	꧀ꦏ	꧀ꦢ	꧀ꦠ	꧀ꦱ	꧀ꦮ	꧀ꦭ	꧀ꦥ	꧀ꦝ	꧀ꦗ	꧀ꦪ	꧀ꦚ	꧀ꦩ	꧀ꦒ	꧀ꦧ	꧀ꦛ	꧀ꦔ
	꧀ꦟ	꧀ꦖ (Note: often used as part of pepadan, which does not have a phonetic function.)	꧀ꦬ	꧀ꦑ		꧀ꦡ	꧀ꦯ			꧀ꦦ				꧀ꦘ		꧀ꦓ	꧀ꦨ		
					꧀ꦣ		꧀ꦰ				꧀ꦞ	꧀ꦙ						꧀ꦜ	

=== Numbers ===
Javanese script has its own numerals (Javanese: ꦲꦁꦏ, romanized: angka) that behave similarly to Arabic numerals. Some of their forms closely resemble other Javanese characters. For instance, the numeral 1 ⟨꧑⟩ resembles the wyanjana character ga ⟨ꦒ⟩, and the numeral 8 ⟨꧘⟩ resembles the murda character pa ⟨ꦦ⟩. To avoid confusion, numerals that are used in the middle of sentences must be surrounded by pada pangkat ⟨꧇ ꧇⟩ or pada lingsa ⟨꧈ ꧈⟩. For example, tanggal 17 Juni ("the date 17 June") is written
ꦠꦁꦒꦭ꧀꧇꧑꧗꧇ꦗꦸꦤꦶ
or
ꦠꦁꦒꦭ꧀꧈꧑꧗꧈ꦗꦸꦤꦶ.

These enclosures can be omitted when the numeral's function is clear from context, such as page numbers in the corner of a page. The forms are as follows:

Angka
0 ꧐	1 ꧑	2 ꧒	3 ꧓	4 ꧔	5 ꧕	6 ꧖	7 ꧗	8 ꧘	9 ꧙

==== Punctuation ====
Traditional Javanese text is written without spaces between words (scriptio continua) and uses a set of punctuation marks known as pada (ꦥꦢ). To separate sentences, Javanese script employs pada lungsi (꧉) when the last syllable is open (without a pangkon) but uses pada lingsa (꧈) when the last syllable is closed (using a pangkon). Conversely, to separate clauses, pada lingsa (꧈) is used if the last syllable is closed, while a space is used if the last syllable is open. This punctuation system differs from the use of periods and commas in Latin script and is often not well understood by contemporary Javanese script users.

Additionally, Javanese script lacks equivalents for question marks, exclamation marks, hyphens, mathematical symbols (including slashes), and semicolons. Consequently, whether a sentence in Javanese script is interrogative (question) or imperative (command) can only be inferred from the context. The various forms of pada are as follows:

Common punctuation
꧈ lingsa	꧉ lungsi	꧊ adeg	꧋ adeg-adeg	꧌...꧍ pisélèh	꧁...꧂ rerenggan	꧇ pangkat	ꧏ rangkap

In modern teaching, the most commonly used punctuation marks in Javanese script are pada adeg-adeg, pada lingsa, and pada lungsi, which function similarly to a paragraph mark (like a pilcrow), a comma, and a full stop, respectively. Pada adeg-adeg opens a paragraph, pada lingsa separates clauses or sentences and pada lungsi ends a sentence. Other punctuation marks include pada adeg and pada pisèlèh, which are used to enclose inserts in the text, similar to parentheses or quotation marks. Pada pangkat functions similarly to a colon. Pada rangkap is sometimes used as a repetition marker, similar to the use of the number "2" in informal Indonesian (e.g. kata-kata ꦏꦠꦏꦠ → ꦏꦠꧏ = kata2).

Some punctuation marks, like rerenggan, have no direct Latin script equivalents and are often purely decorative. They are frequently used to frame titles or sections of text, with considerable variation among writers. In correspondence, certain punctuation marks indicate the sender’s social status. Pada andhap denotes low status, pada madya denotes middle status, pada luhur denotes high status, and pada guru is neutral, without social connotations. Pada pancak is used to end a letter. However, these distinctions are generalized. The actual forms and functions of these punctuation marks are highly variable, with specific regional and personal styles.

In traditional manuscripts, some royal scribes used specific correction marks instead of crossing out errors. Tirta tumétès is found in Yogyakarta manuscripts, while isèn-isèn is found in Surakarta manuscripts.

==== Pepadan ====
Aside from regular punctuation, one of the distinctive features in Javanese script writing is pepadan (ꦥꦼꦥꦢꦤ꧀), a series of highly ornate verse marks.

Behrend (1996) categorizes pepadan into two general groups: small pada, which are single punctuation marks, and large pada, which are often composed of several marks arranged in a sequence. Small pada are used to indicate stanza breaks, typically appearing every 32 to 48 syllables depending on the meter used. Large pada mark a change in tembang, or canto, and usually appear every 5 to 10 pages, depending on the structure of the text. Javanese writing guides often identify three types of large pada purwa pada used at the beginning of the first tembang, madya pada used at tembang transitions, and wasana pada used at the end of the text. However, these three marks are often merged and treated as one in many Javanese texts.

Pepadan
꧅ ꦧ꧀ꦖ ꧅ purwa pada	꧅ ꦟ꧀ꦢꦿ ꧅ madya pada	꧅ ꦆ ꧅ wasana pada

Pepadan is a visually prominent element in Javanese manuscripts and may be rendered in color or even gilded. In some luxurious manuscripts, the form of pepadan can even serve as a clue to the song being used; for instance, pepadan featuring wings or crow-like birds (dhandhang in Javanese) refers to the dhandhanggula tembang, while those featuring goldfish allude to the maskumambang ("gold floating in water") tembang. One of the key centers for producing manuscripts with exceptional pepadan designs was the scriptorium of Pakualaman in Yogyakarta.

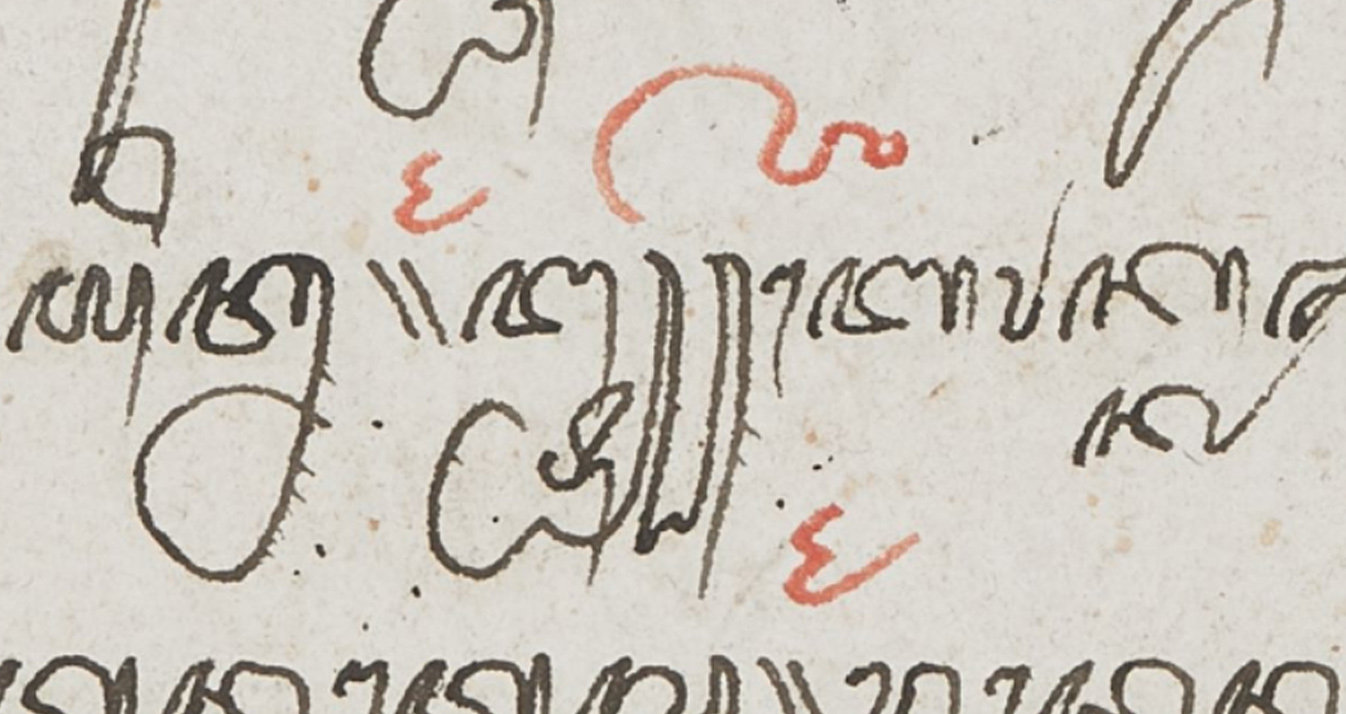
Pepadan from Serat, minor pada ꧅

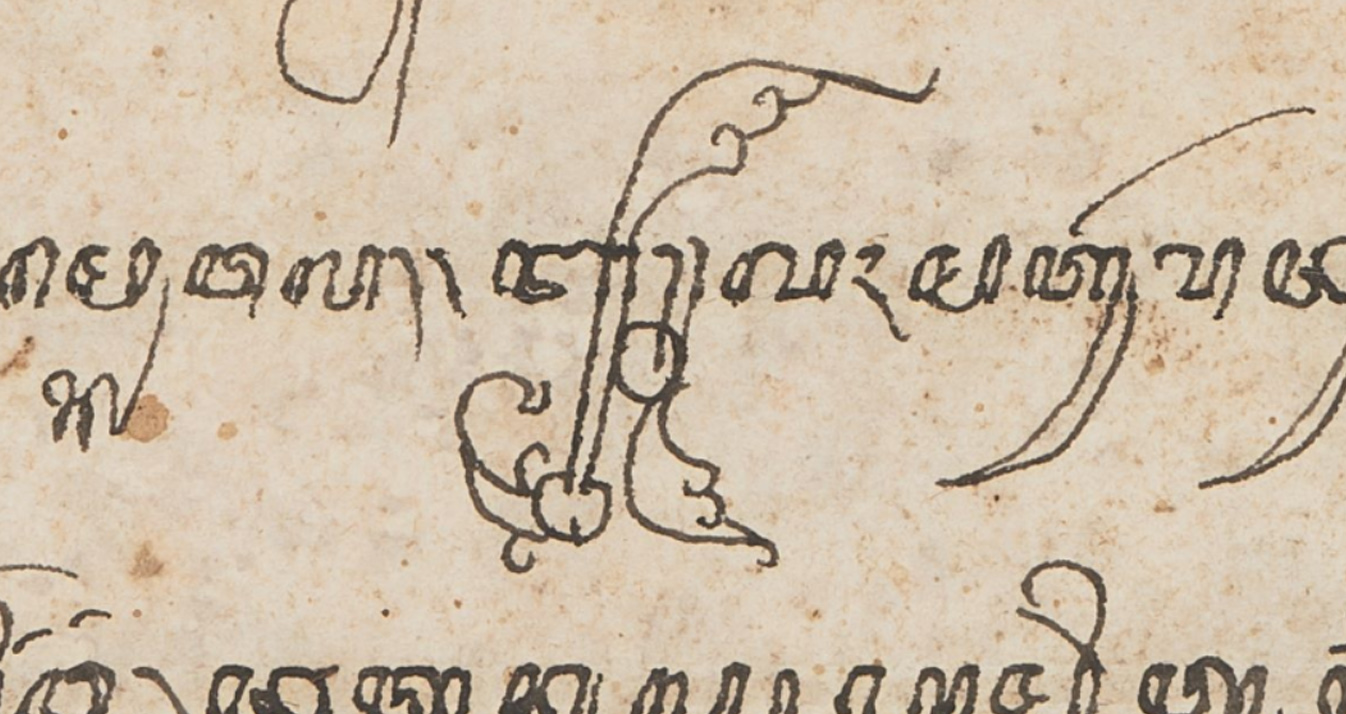
Pepadan from Babad Mataram, minor pada ꧅

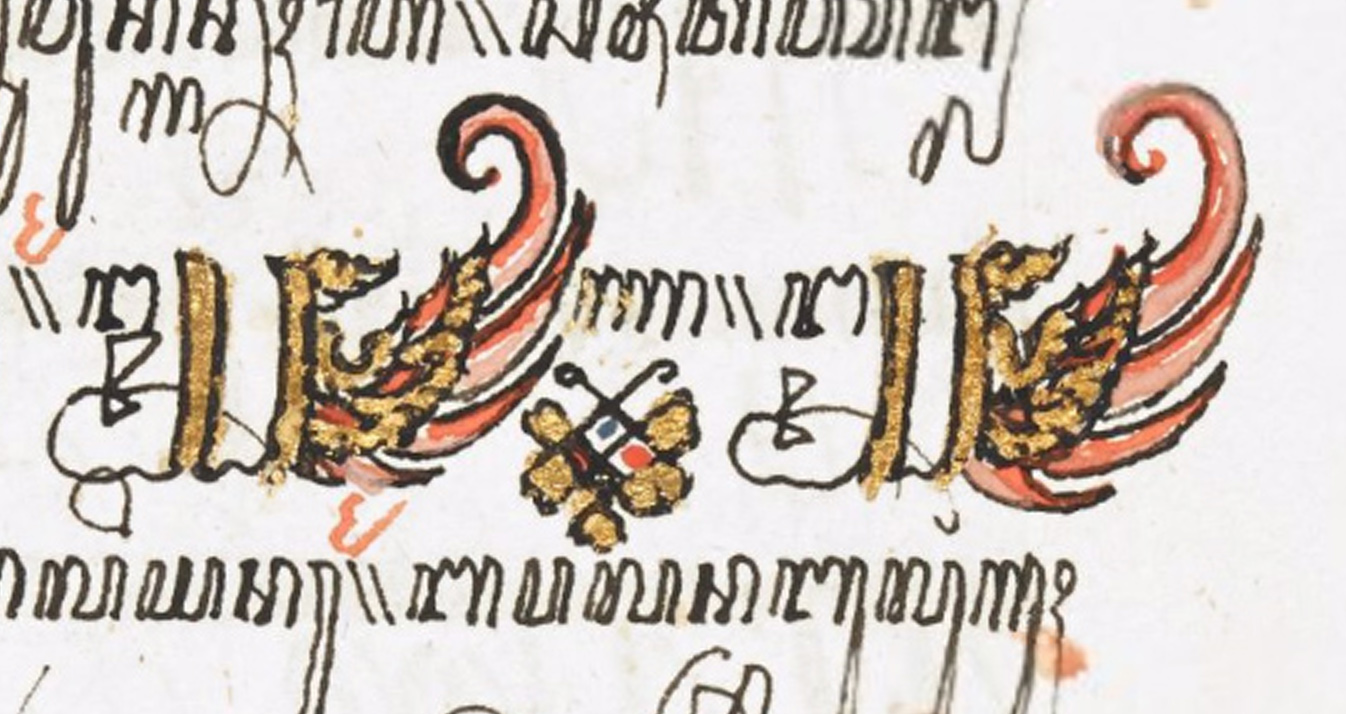
Pepadan from Serat Jayalengkara, major pada ꧅ ꦧ꧀ꦖ ꧅

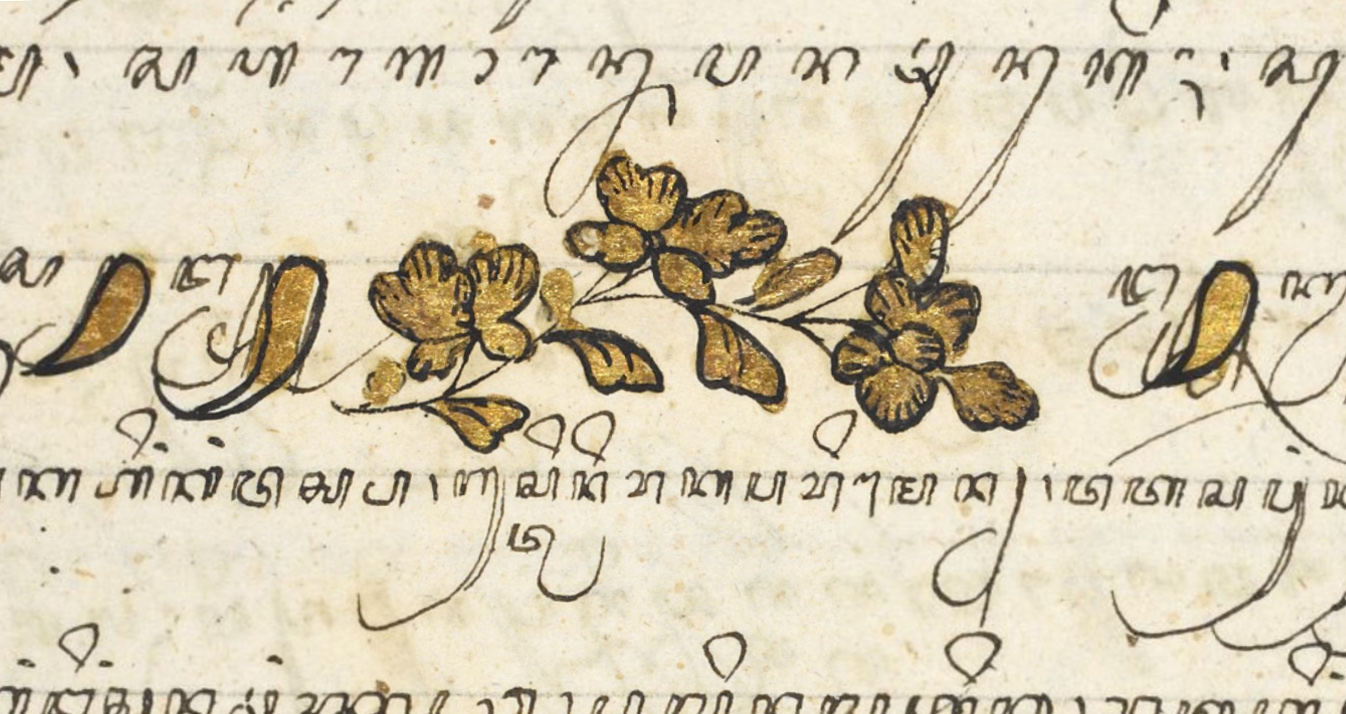
Pepadan from serat selarasa, major pada ꧅ ꦧ꧀ꦖ ꧅

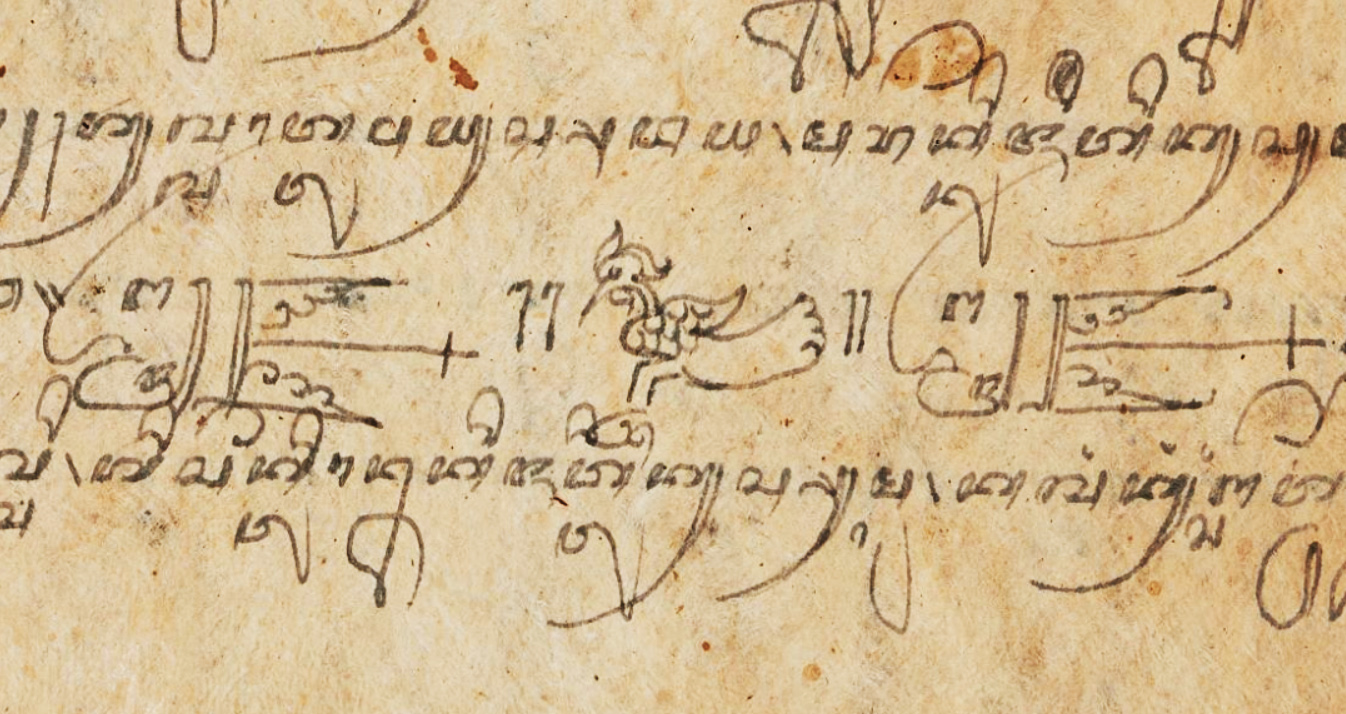

== Sample text ==
Excerpt from the Treatise on Cats (Javanese: ꦱꦼꦫꦠ꧀ꦏꦠꦸꦫꦁꦒꦤ꧀ꦏꦸꦕꦶꦁ, romanized: Serat Katuranggan Kucing), printed in 1871 with modern Javanese language and spelling.

==== Javanese ====
꧅ꦭꦩꦸꦤ꧀ꦱꦶꦫꦔꦶꦔꦸꦏꦸꦕꦶꦁ꧈ ꦲꦮꦏ꧀ꦏꦺꦲꦶꦉꦁꦱꦢꦪ꧈ ꦭꦩ꧀ꦧꦸꦁꦏꦶꦮꦠꦺꦩ꧀ꦧꦺꦴꦁꦥꦸꦠꦶꦃ꧈ ꦊꦏ꧀ꦱꦤꦤ꧀ꦤꦶꦫꦥꦿꦪꦺꦴꦒ꧈ ꦲꦫꦤ꧀ꦮꦸꦭꦤ꧀ꦏꦿꦲꦶꦤꦤ꧀‍꧈ ꦠꦶꦤꦼꦏꦤꦤ꧀ꦱꦱꦼꦢꦾꦤ꧀ꦤꦶꦥꦸꦤ꧀‍꧈ ꦪꦺꦤ꧀ꦧꦸꦟ꧀ꦝꦼꦭ꧀ꦭꦁꦏꦸꦁꦲꦸꦠꦩ꧈ ꧅ꦲꦗꦱꦶꦫꦔꦶꦔꦸꦏꦸꦕꦶꦁ꧈ ꦭꦸꦫꦶꦏ꧀ꦲꦶꦉꦁꦧꦸꦤ꧀ꦠꦸꦠ꧀ꦥꦚ꧀ꦗꦁ꧈ ꦥꦸꦤꦶꦏꦲꦮꦺꦴꦤ꧀ꦭꦩꦠ꧀ꦠꦺ꧈ ꦱꦼꦏꦼꦭꦤ꧀ꦱꦿꦶꦁꦠꦸꦏꦂꦫꦤ꧀‍꧈ ꦲꦫꦤ꧀ꦝꦣꦁꦱꦸꦁꦏꦮ꧈ ꦥꦤ꧀ꦲꦢꦺꦴꦃꦫꦶꦗꦼꦏꦶꦤꦶꦥꦸꦤ꧀‍꧈ ꦪꦺꦤ꧀ꦧꦸꦟ꧀ꦝꦼꦭ꧀ꦤꦺꦴꦫꦔꦥꦲ꧈

==== Romanized ====
Lamun sira ngingu kucing, awaké ireng sadaya, lambung kiwa tèmbong putih, leksan nira prayoga, aran wulan krahinan, tinekanan sasedyan nira ipun, yèn buṇḍel langkung utama.

Aja sira ngingu kucing, lurik ireng buntut panjang, punika awon lamaté, sekelan sring tukaran, aran ḍaḍang sungkawa, pan adoh rijeki nipun, yèn buṇḍel nora ngapa.

==== Translation ====
A completely black cat with a white patch on its left belly is called Harvest Moon. It is a cat that brings good fortune and the fulfilment of all wishes. It is better if it is bobtailed. A dark striped cat with a long tail should not be kept as a pet. Such a cat is called Mourning Crow. You would encounter frequent arguments and limited wealth. But if it is bobtailed, then there is no problem.

== Madurese ==
In Madurese, the Javanese script is referred to as carakan Madhurâ or carakan Jhâbân (script from Javanese). While in Javanese, each consonant includes an inherent /a/ or /ɔ/, in Madurese, the inherent vowel is /a/ or /ɤ/. Another difference is the use of the wignyan, which adds aspiration to a syllable in Javanese but indicates a glottal stop in Madurese.

Only five aksara rèka'an (additional letters) are taught in Madurese schools.

=== Sample text ===
Below is the use of carakan in Bab oreng megha djhoeko e'tana Djhaba sareng Madhoera (Chapter on people catching fish in the land of Java and Madura), accompanied by the modern Madurese spelling.

==== Madurese ====
ꦥꦫꦲꦺꦴꦥꦩꦺꦒꦃꦲꦤ꧀ꦤꦺꦥꦺꦴꦤ꧀ꦗꦸꦏꦺꦴꦃꦏꦺꦔꦺꦁꦧꦶꦢꦃꦲꦒꦶꦢꦢ꧀ꦢꦶꦝꦸꦧꦂꦤ꧇

꧑꧇ ꦥꦫꦲꦺꦴ꧈ ꦱꦺꦲꦺꦧꦝꦶꦝꦫꦶꦏꦗꦸꦧꦸꦁꦏꦺꦴꦭ꧀ꦱꦺꦲꦺꦭꦺꦴꦧꦔꦺ꧉ ꦧꦝꦱꦺꦲꦺꦱꦺ ꦩ꧀ꦧꦸꦏꦗꦸꦥꦺꦴꦭꦺꦲꦺꦥꦺꦁꦒꦶꦂ꧈ ꦧꦝꦱꦺꦧꦸꦤ꧀ꦠꦼꦤ꧀꧈

꧒꧇ ꦥꦫꦲꦺꦴꦱꦺꦲꦺꦧꦝꦶꦝꦫꦶꦥꦥꦤ꧀ꦫꦧ꧀ꦠꦼꦤ꧀ꦧꦤ꧀ꦱꦢꦗ꧉

==== Romanized ====
Parao pamèghâ'ânnèpon jhuko' kèngèng bhidhâ'aghi dhâddhi ḍu bârna:
1. Parao, sè èbhâḍhi ḍâri kaju bungkol sè èlobângè. Bâḍâ sè èsèmbu kaju polè è pèngghir, bâḍâ sè bhunten
2. Parao sè èbhâḍhi papan rabten bân sadhâjâ.

==== Translation ====
Fishing boats can be classified into two types:
1. Boats made from hollowed-out logs. Some have additional planks attached to the sides, while others do not.
2. Boats made entirely from planks.

== Sundanese ==
In Sundanese, the Javanese script is referred to as aksara Sunda cacarakan, aksara Sunda Basisir Kalér, aksara Sunda Jawa, or simply cacarakan.

Cacarakan is nearly identical to Javanese hanacaraka, consisting of consonants (Sundanese: nglagena), gedé (murda, honorific letters), and panambah (vowels, swara), sandangan (diacritics) and pada (punctuation).

There are minor differences between the Javanese and Sundanese alphabets. The Sundanese language does not have dental da and retroflex ta, so the dha letter is used to replace the da letter. The shape of the nya letter is derived from the na letter, with the nya pair positioned as a subscript.

Da and nya
	da	nya
Javanese	ꦢ꧀ꦢ da	ꦚ꧀ꦚ nya
Sundanese	ꦝ꧀ꦝ da	ꦤ꧀ꦚ꧀ꦚ nya

=== Sample text ===
==== Sundanese ====
꧄ ꦠꦸꦮꦤ꧀ ꦮꦶꦤ꧀ꦠꦼꦂꦗꦸꦫꦸꦧꦱ꧈ ꦗꦼꦤꦼꦁꦔꦤ꧀ꦤꦤꦤꦸꦔꦁꦒꦶꦠ꧀꧈ ꦩꦶꦤ꧀ꦝꦃꦏꦼꦤ꧀ꦏꦧꦱꦗꦮ꧈ ꦔ꦳ꦪꦼꦤꦝꦶꦱꦭꦶꦤ꧀ꦝꦼꦆ꧈ ꦝꦶꦱꦸꦤ꧀ꦝꦏꦼꦤ꧀ꦱꦏꦭꦶ꧈ ꦏꦸꦏꦮꦸꦭꦔ꦳ꦸꦫꦁꦒꦫꦸꦠ꧀꧈ ꦔ꦳ꦫꦶꦔ꦳ꦤꦸꦝꦶꦥꦭꦂ꧈ ꦔ꦳ꦸꦫꦁꦱꦸꦤ꧀ꦝꦠꦩ꧀ꦧꦃꦫꦗꦶꦤ꧀꧈ ꦫꦺꦪꦕꦿꦶꦠꦧꦫꦶꦱ꧀ꦲ꦳ꦼꦤ꧀ꦠꦼꦁꦏꦭꦏꦸꦮꦤ꧀꧉

==== Romanized ====
Tuwan Winter jurubasa, Jenenganana nu nganggit, Mindahkeun ka basa Jawa, Ayeuna disalin deui, Disundakeun sakali, Ku kawula urang Garut, Ari anu dipalar, Urang Sunda tambah rajin, Réa crita baris eunteung kalakuan.

==== Translation ====
Tuwan Winter the linguist, He who wrote it, Who translated it into Javanese, Now it is copied again, Translated into Sundanese, By me, a person from Garut. The hope is, that Sundanese people become more diligent, With many stories as reflections of deeds.

—Dongéng-dongéng Pieunteungeun (Stories as Reflections), Moehamad Moesa

== Comparison with Balinese ==
The closest relative of the Javanese script is the Balinese script. As a direct descendant of the Kawi script, Javanese and Balinese scripts still share many similarities in the basic structure of each letter. One striking difference between Javanese and Balinese scripts is the writing system; the Balinese writing system tends to be more conservative and retains many aspects of Kawi orthography that are no longer used in Javanese script. For example, the word "desa" in Javanese script is now written as ꦢꦺꦱ whereas in Balinese it is written as ᬤ᭄ᬲ.

Some Javanese letters and their Balinese equivalents
ha ꦲ	na ꦤ	ca ꦕ	ra ꦫ	ka ꦏ	a ꦄ	ā ꦄ	i ꦆ	ī ꦇ	u ꦈ	ū ꦈꦴ
ᬳ	ᬦ	ᬘ	ᬭ	ᬓ	ᬅ	ᬆ	ᬇ	ᬈ	ᬉ	ᬊ

== Unicode ==
Javanese script was added to the Unicode Standard in October, 2009 with the release of version 5.2. The Unicode block for Javanese is U+A980–U+A9DF. There are 91 code points for Javanese script: 53 letters, 19 punctuation marks, 10 numbers, and 9 vowels:

Javanese^{[1]}^{[2]} Official Unicode Consortium code chart (PDF)
	0	1	2	3	4	5	6	7	8	9	A	B	C	D	E	F
U+A98x	ꦀ	ꦁ	ꦂ	ꦃ	ꦄ	ꦅ	ꦆ	ꦇ	ꦈ	ꦉ	ꦊ	ꦋ	ꦌ	ꦍ	ꦎ	ꦏ
U+A99x	ꦐ	ꦑ	ꦒ	ꦓ	ꦔ	ꦕ	ꦖ	ꦗ	ꦘ	ꦙ	ꦚ	ꦛ	ꦜ	ꦝ	ꦞ	ꦟ
U+A9Ax	ꦠ	ꦡ	ꦢ	ꦣ	ꦤ	ꦥ	ꦦ	ꦧ	ꦨ	ꦩ	ꦪ	ꦫ	ꦬ	ꦭ	ꦮ	ꦯ
U+A9Bx	ꦰ	ꦱ	ꦲ	꦳	ꦴ	ꦵ	ꦶ	ꦷ	ꦸ	ꦹ	ꦺ	ꦻ	ꦼ	ꦽ	ꦾ	ꦿ
U+A9Cx	꧀	꧁	꧂	꧃	꧄	꧅	꧆	꧇	꧈	꧉	꧊	꧋	꧌	꧍		ꧏ
U+A9Dx	꧐	꧑	꧒	꧓	꧔	꧕	꧖	꧗	꧘	꧙					꧞	꧟
Notes 1.As of Unicode version 18.0 2.Grey areas indicate non-assigned code points

== Gallery ==
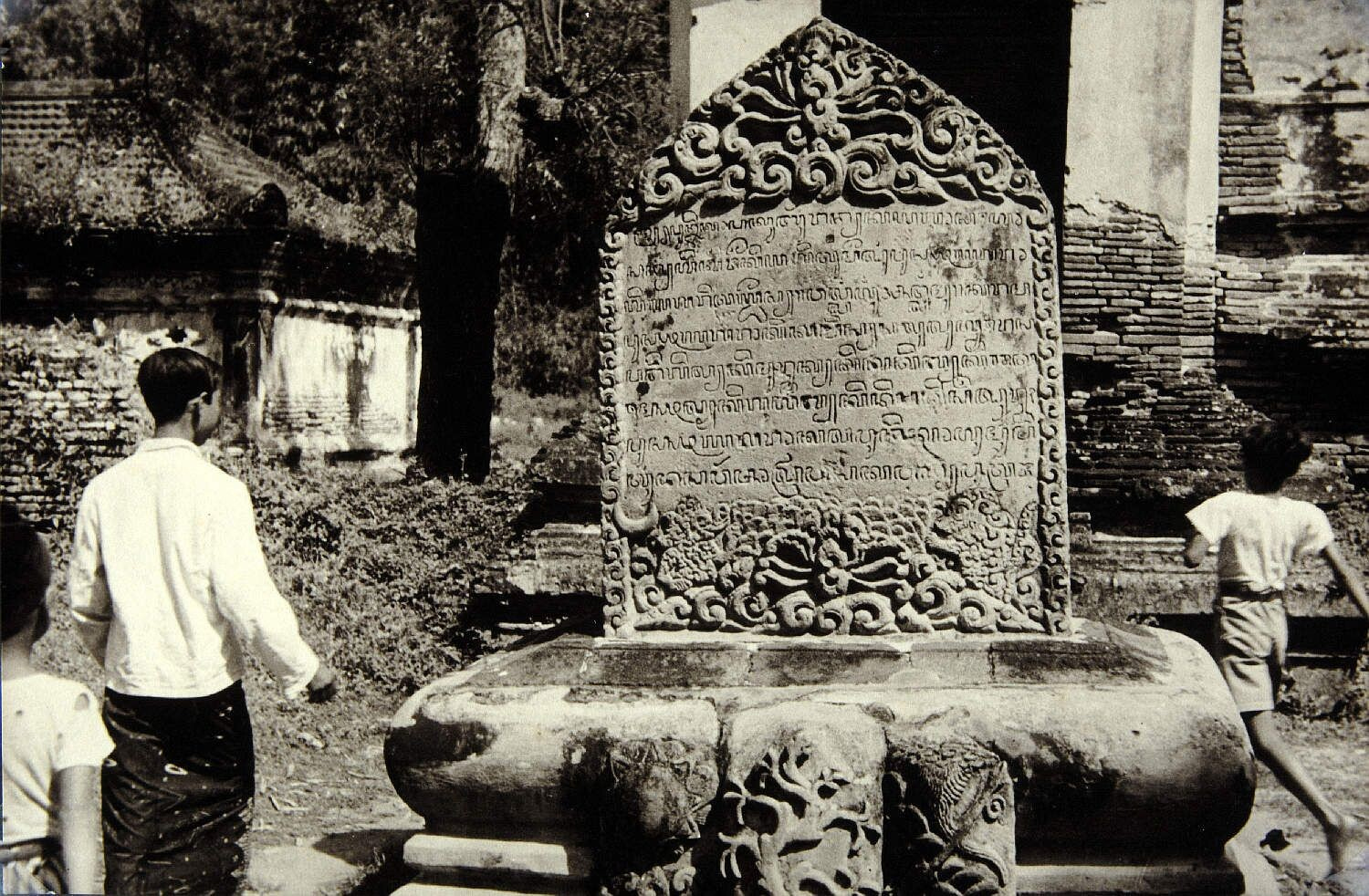
A stone inscription from around 18th century in the Kyai Tumenggung Pusponegoro grave complex, Gresik

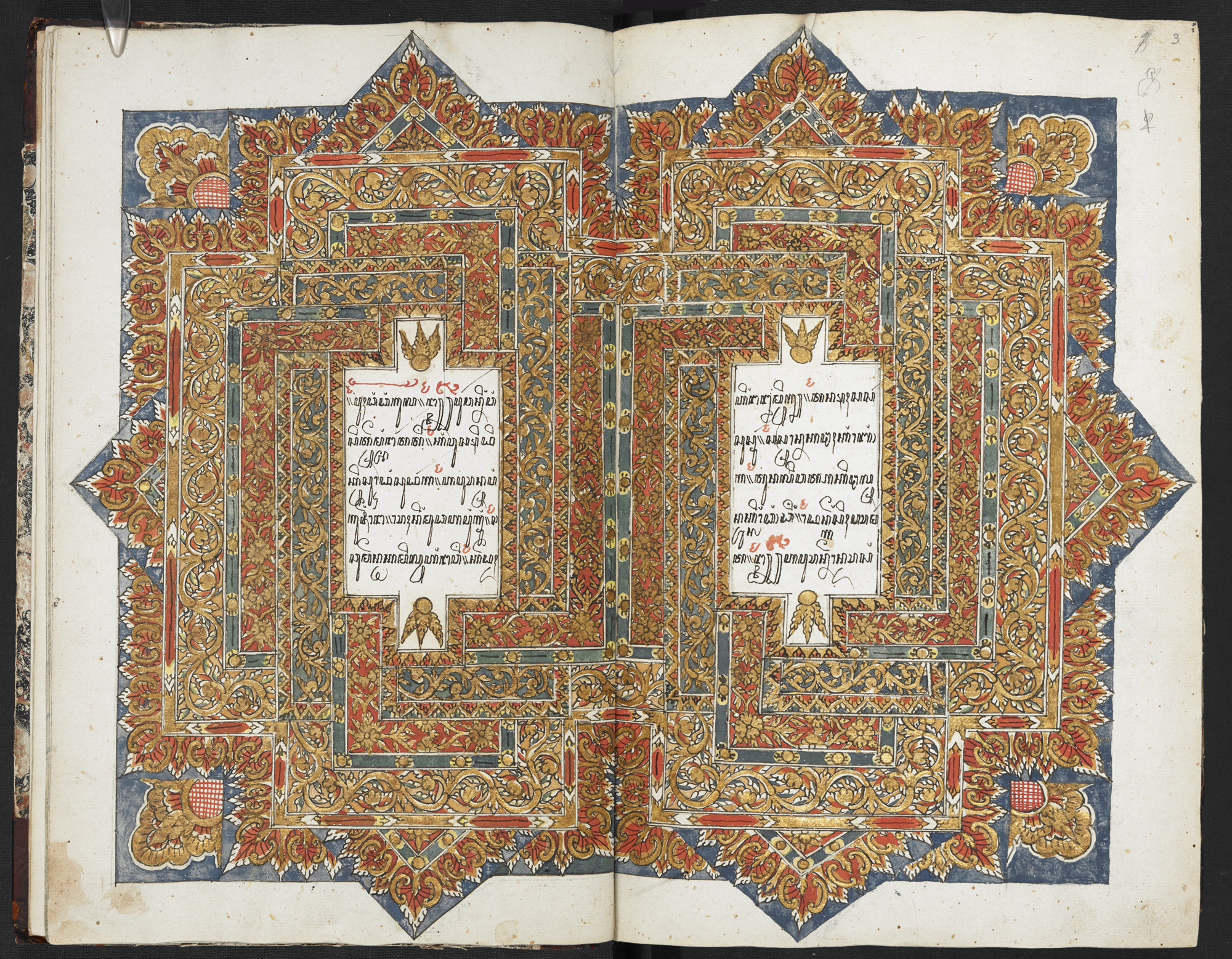
A page from Serat Jaya Lengkara Wulang copied in 1803, British Library collection

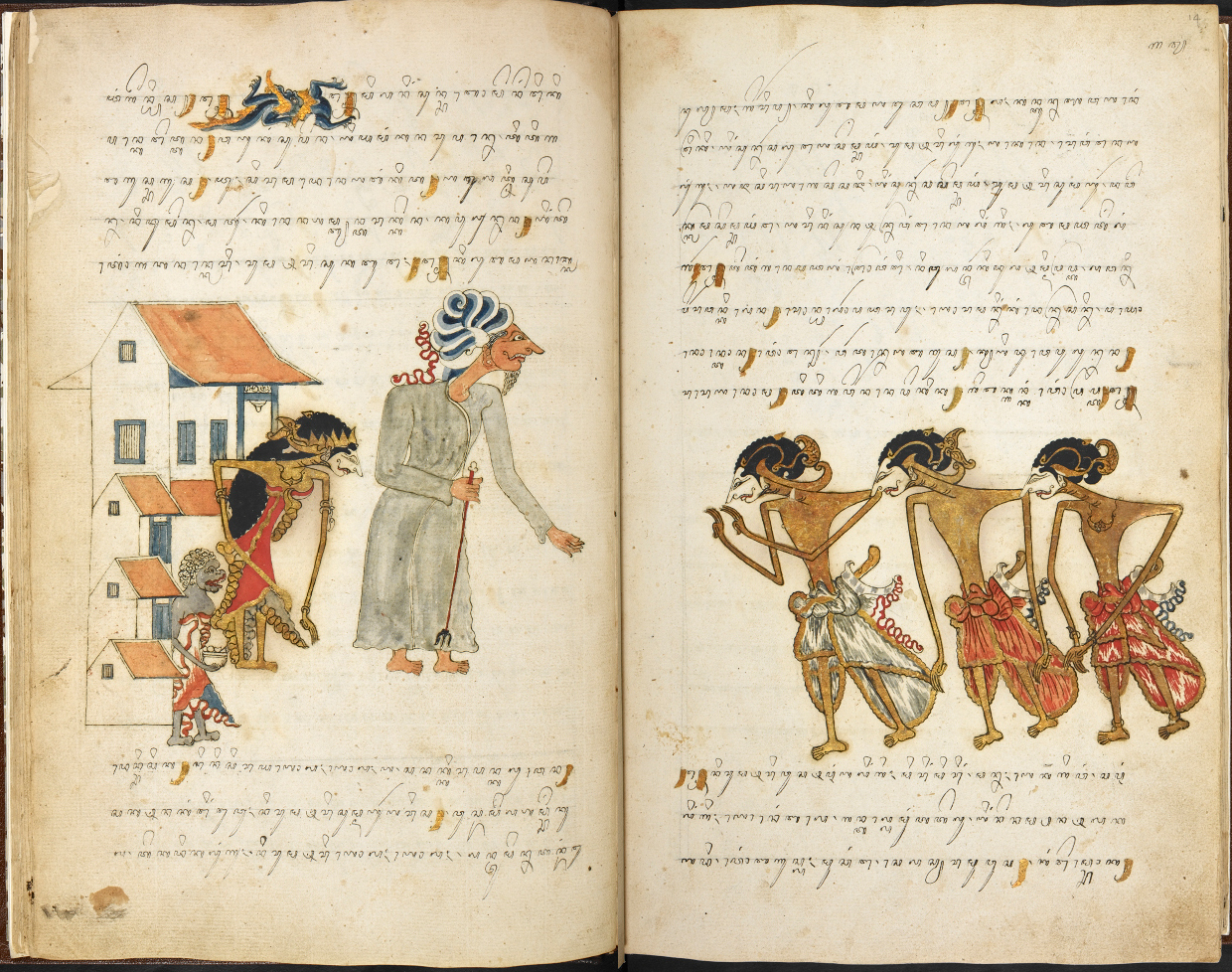
A page from Serat Damar Wulan copied in 1804, British Library collection

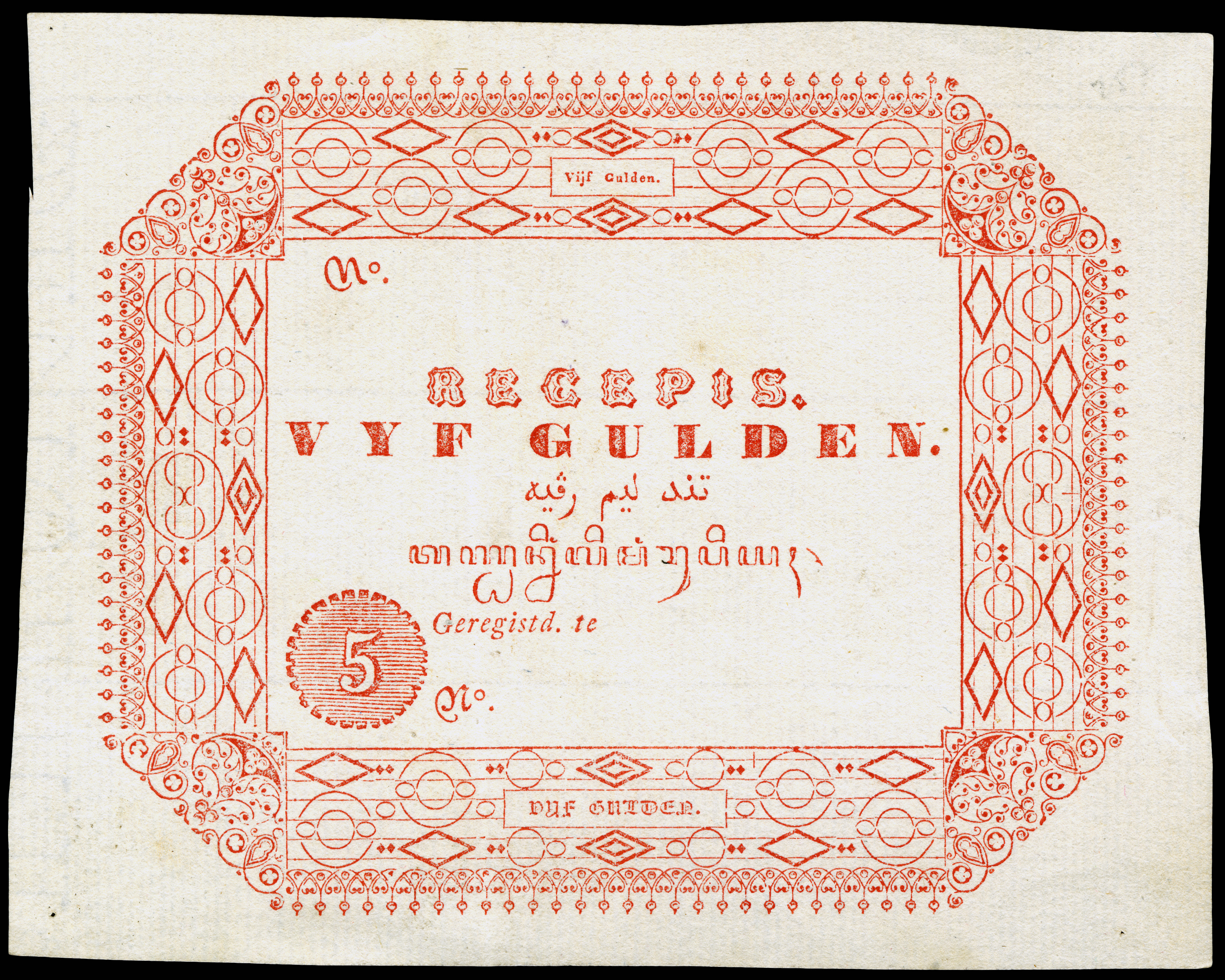
Five Gulden/Rupiah scrip issued by Dutch East Indies in 1846, value spelled in Latin, Pégon, and Javanese script

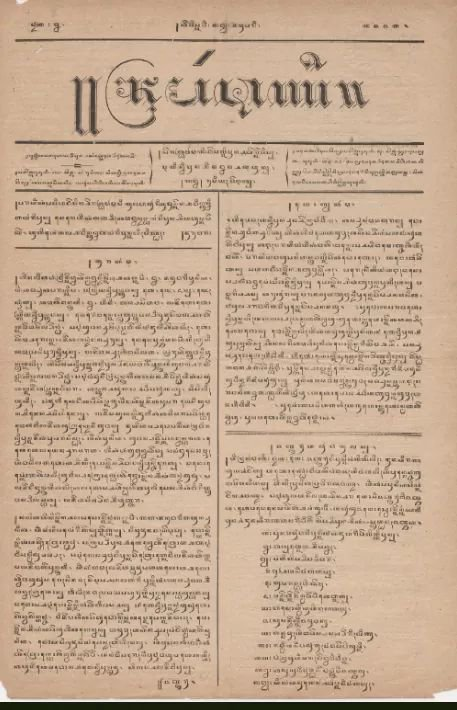
Bromartani newspaper, the first newspaper printed in Javanese language and script, circulating between 1855 and 1856

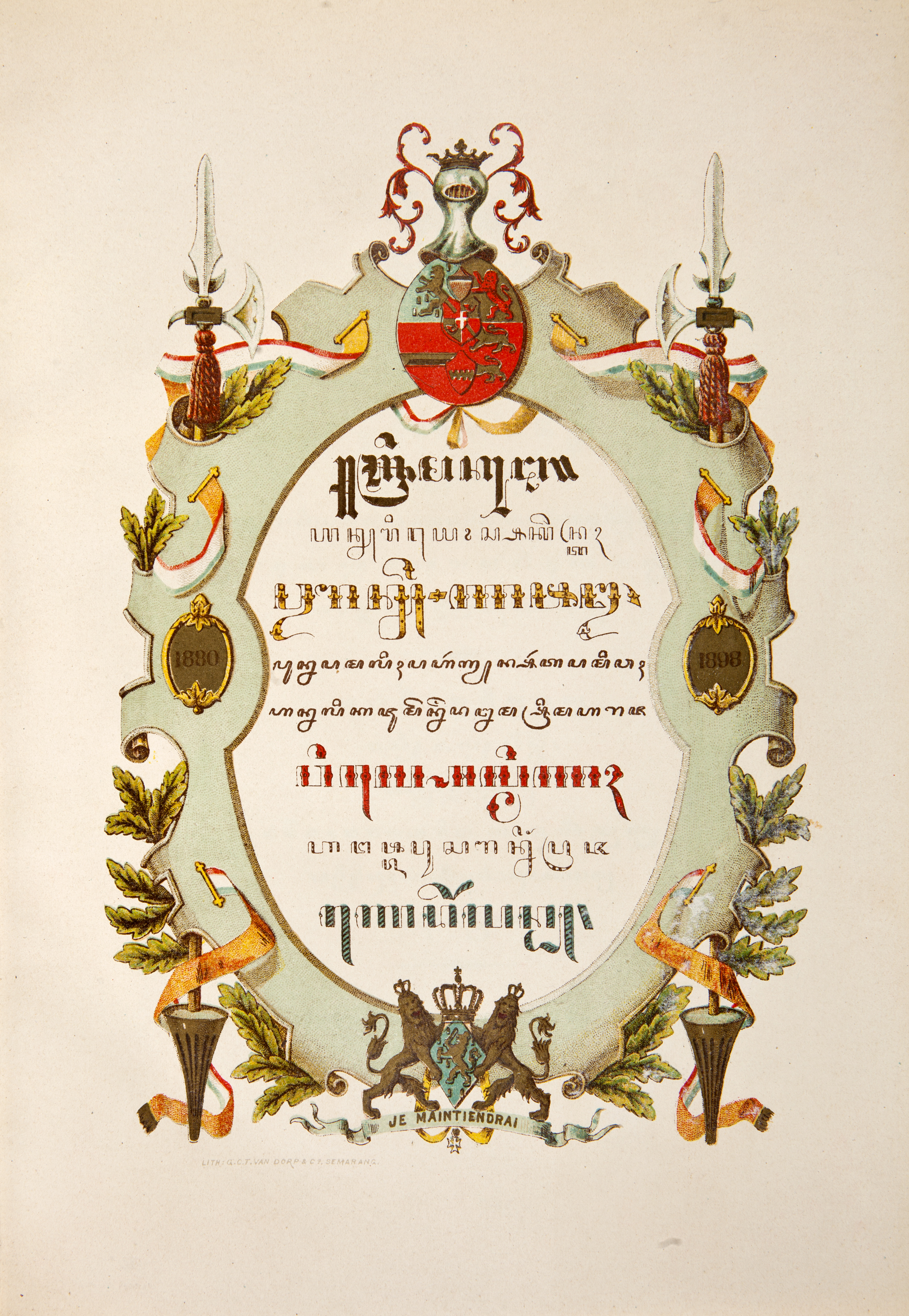
Title page of a book commemorating the ascension of Queen Wilhelmina, printed in Semarang in 1898

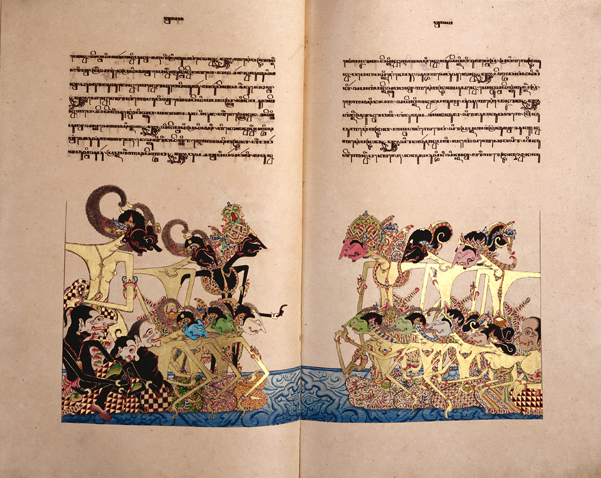
A page from Serat Bratayudha (an episode of Mahabharata) copied in 1902, Widya Budaya collection

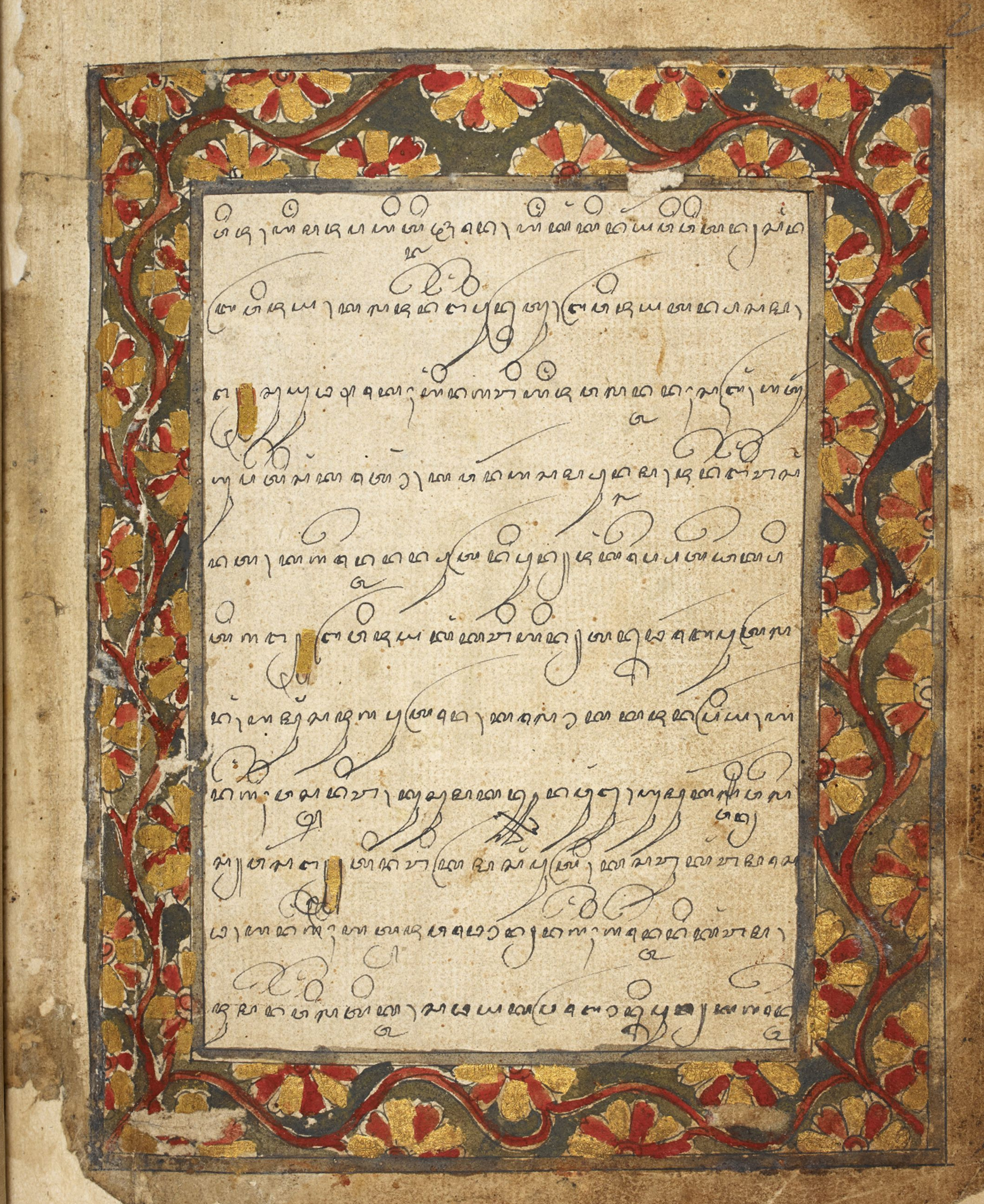
Opening pages of Serat Damar Wulan copied around the 18th century, British Library collection

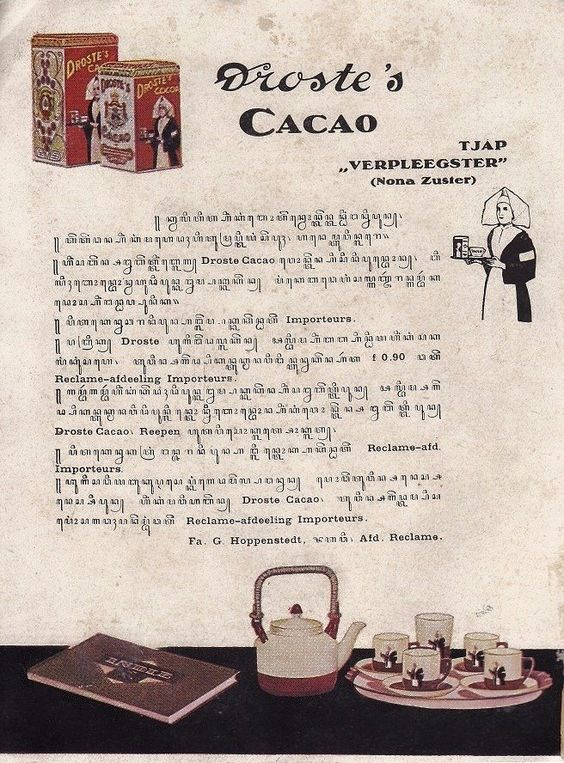
An advertisement for Droste's Cacao

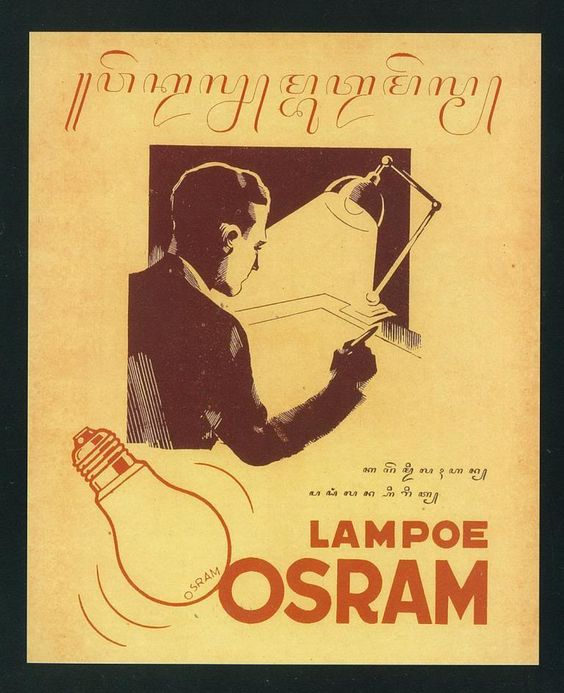
An advertisement for Osram light bulb

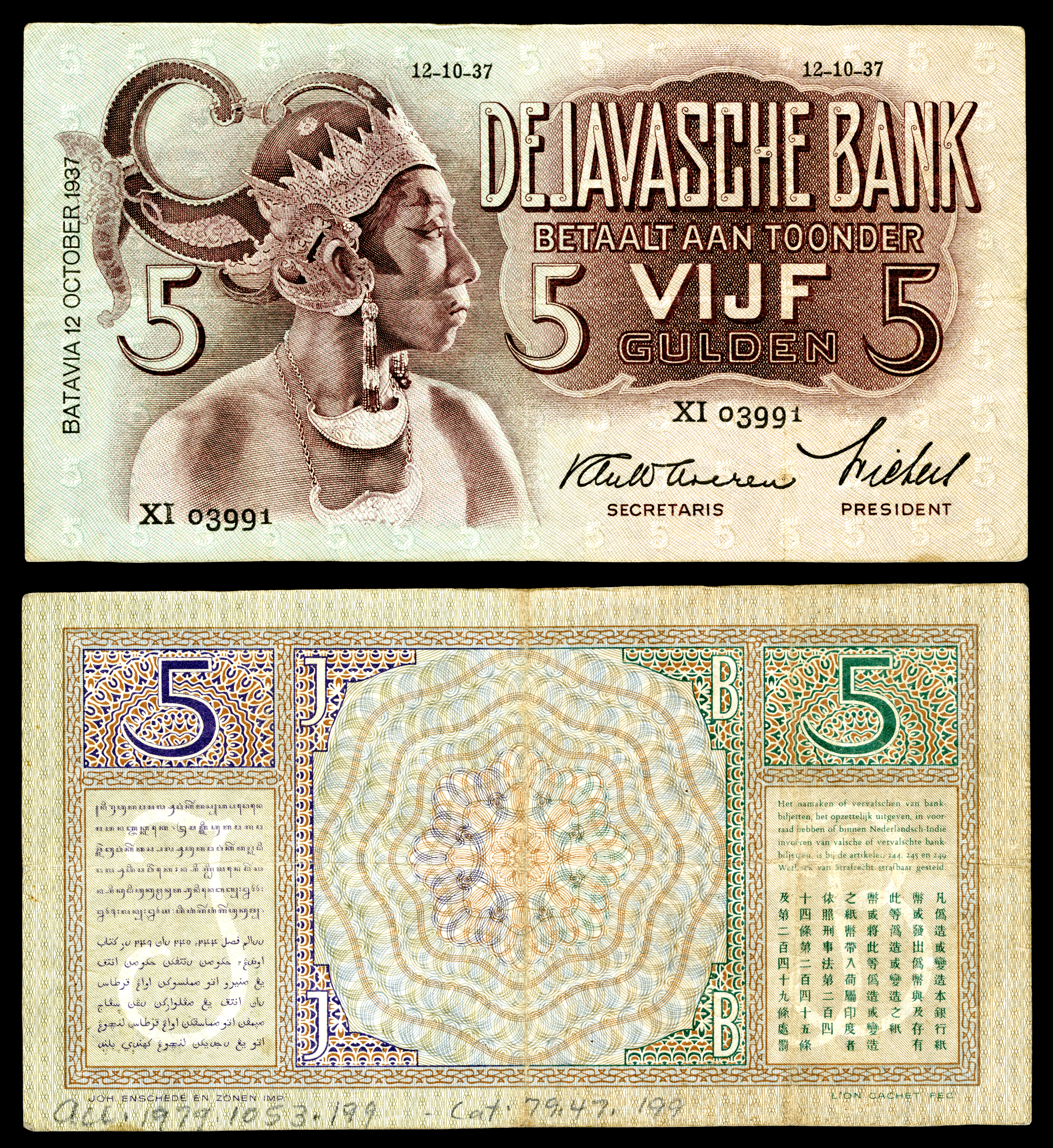
5 Gulden paper currency issued by the Bank of Java in 1937, with multilingual forgery warnings, including one in Javanese language and script

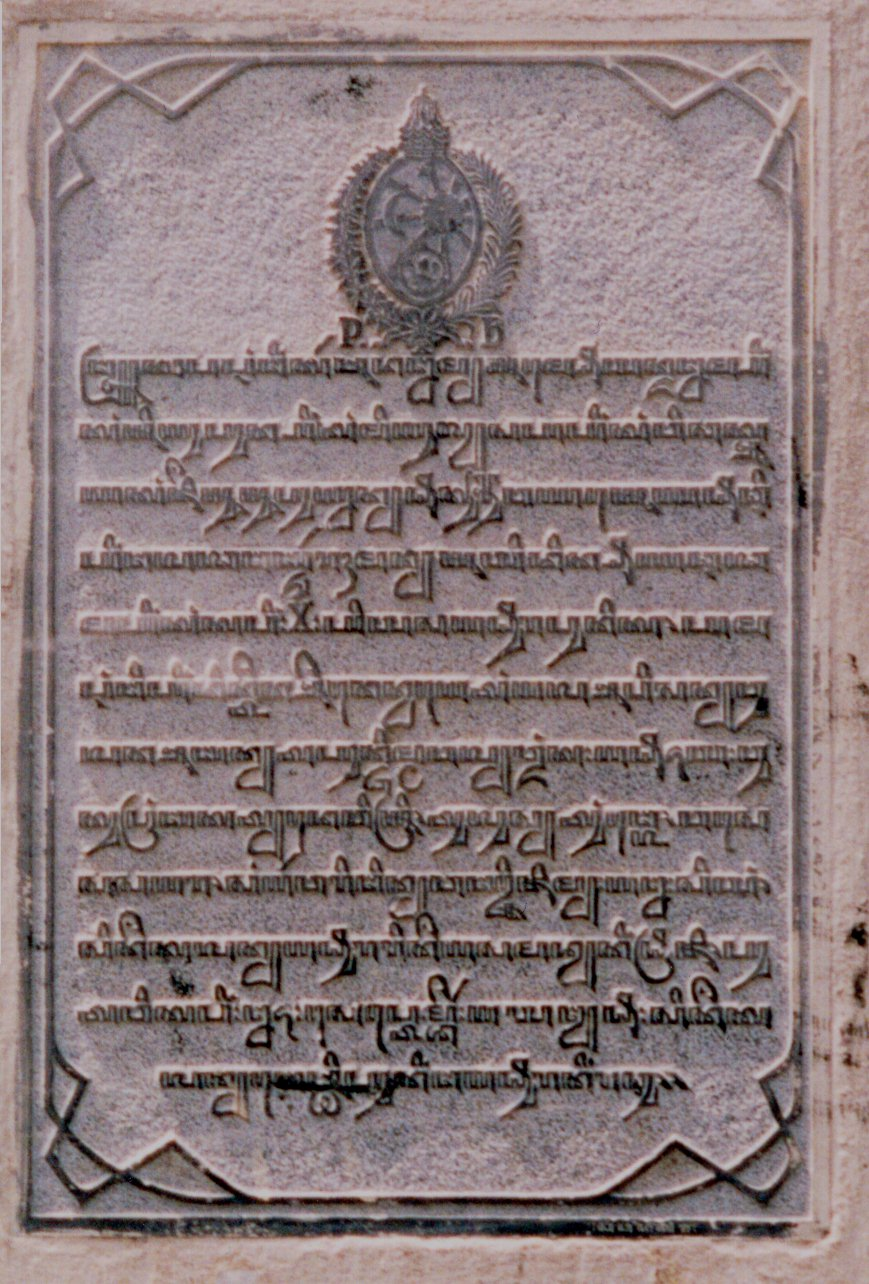
Pakubuwana X inscription commemorating the construction of several gateways in Surakarta in 1938

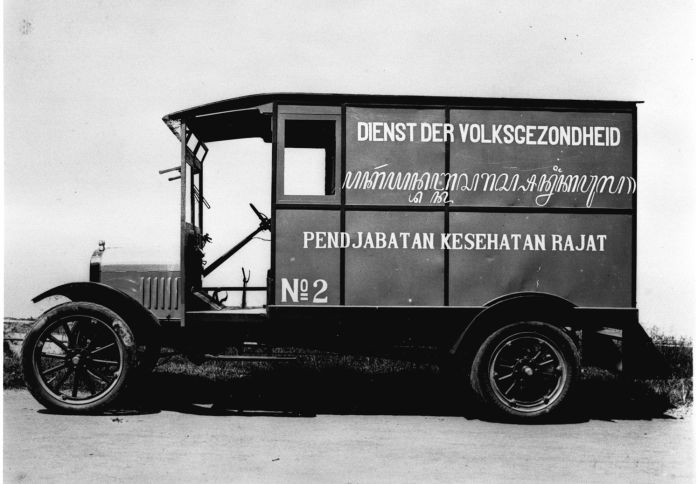
A patrol car used by the Public Health Service (Dienst der Volksgezondheid) c. 1925

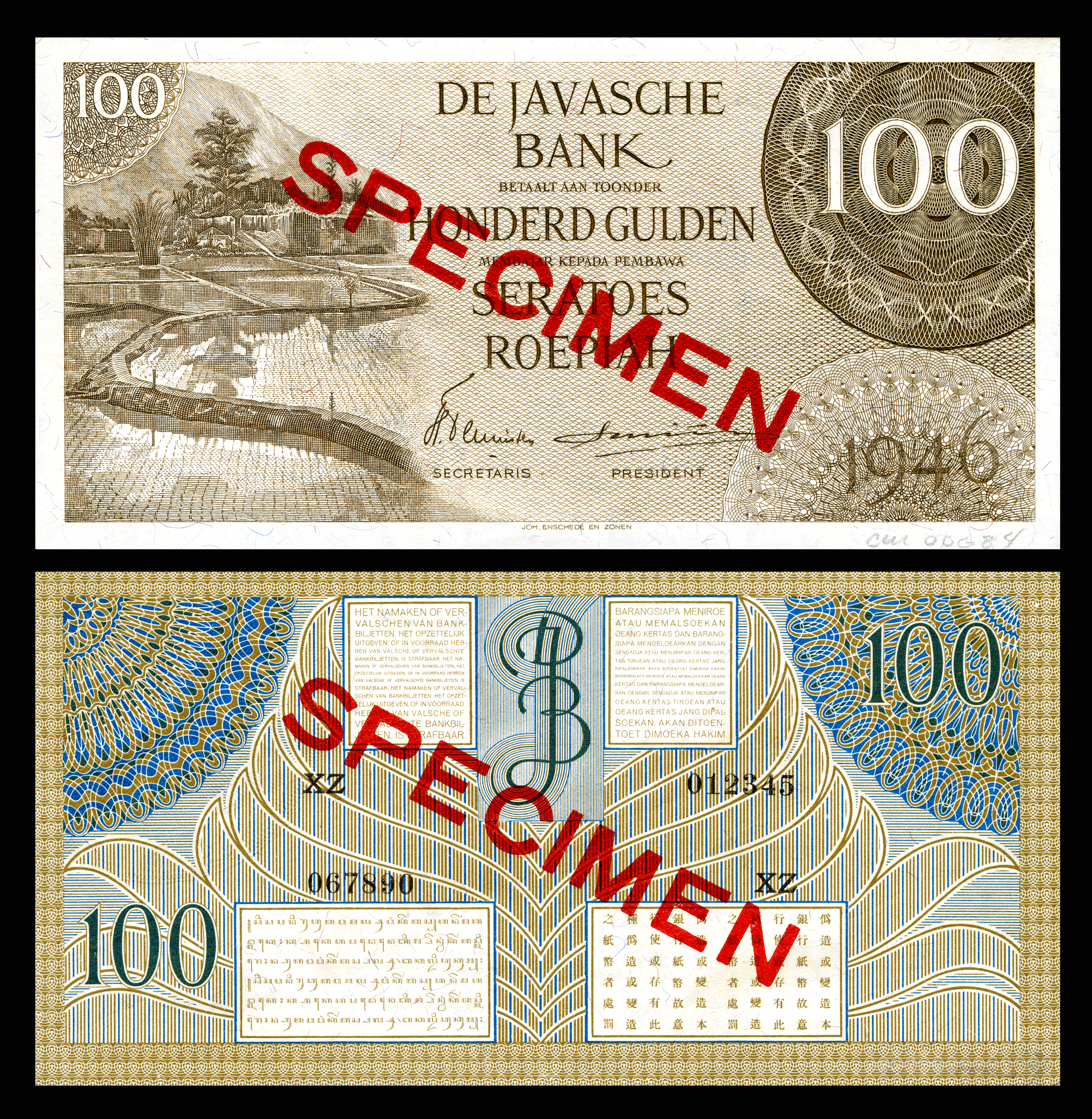
100 Gulden paper currency issued by the Bank of Java in 1946, the last Gulden series that contains Javanese script. Later reprinted in 1950

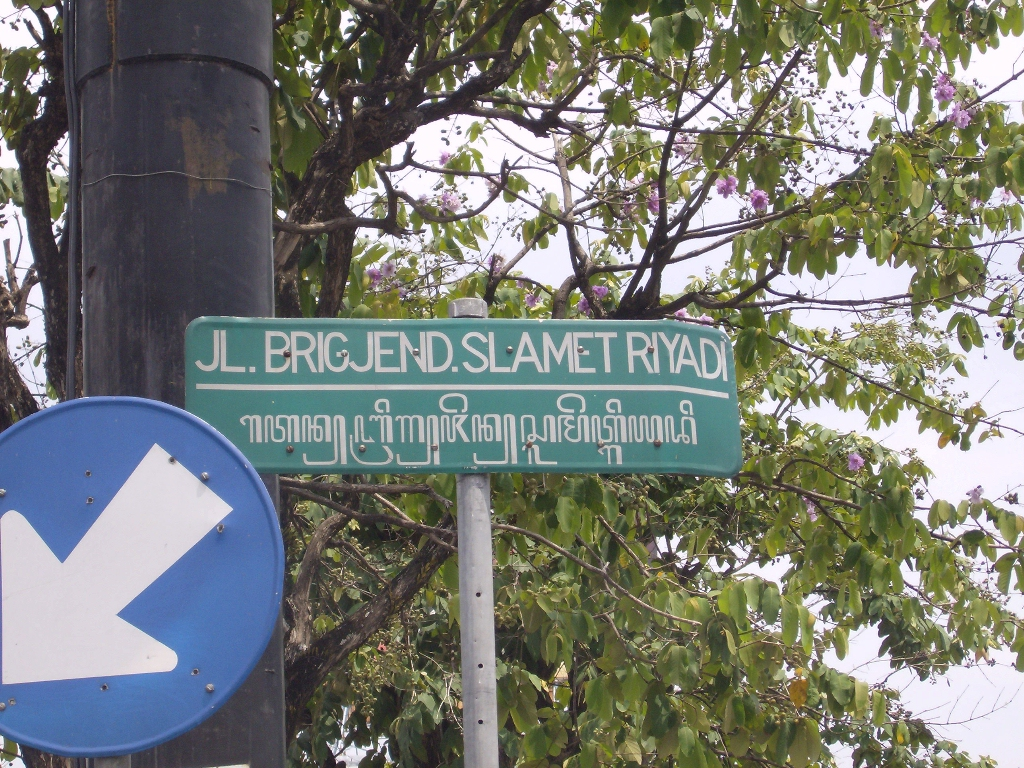
A street sign in Surakarta. The word jendral in the sign has been misspelled and should have used taling in accordance to how it is pronounced in Javanese, jèndral

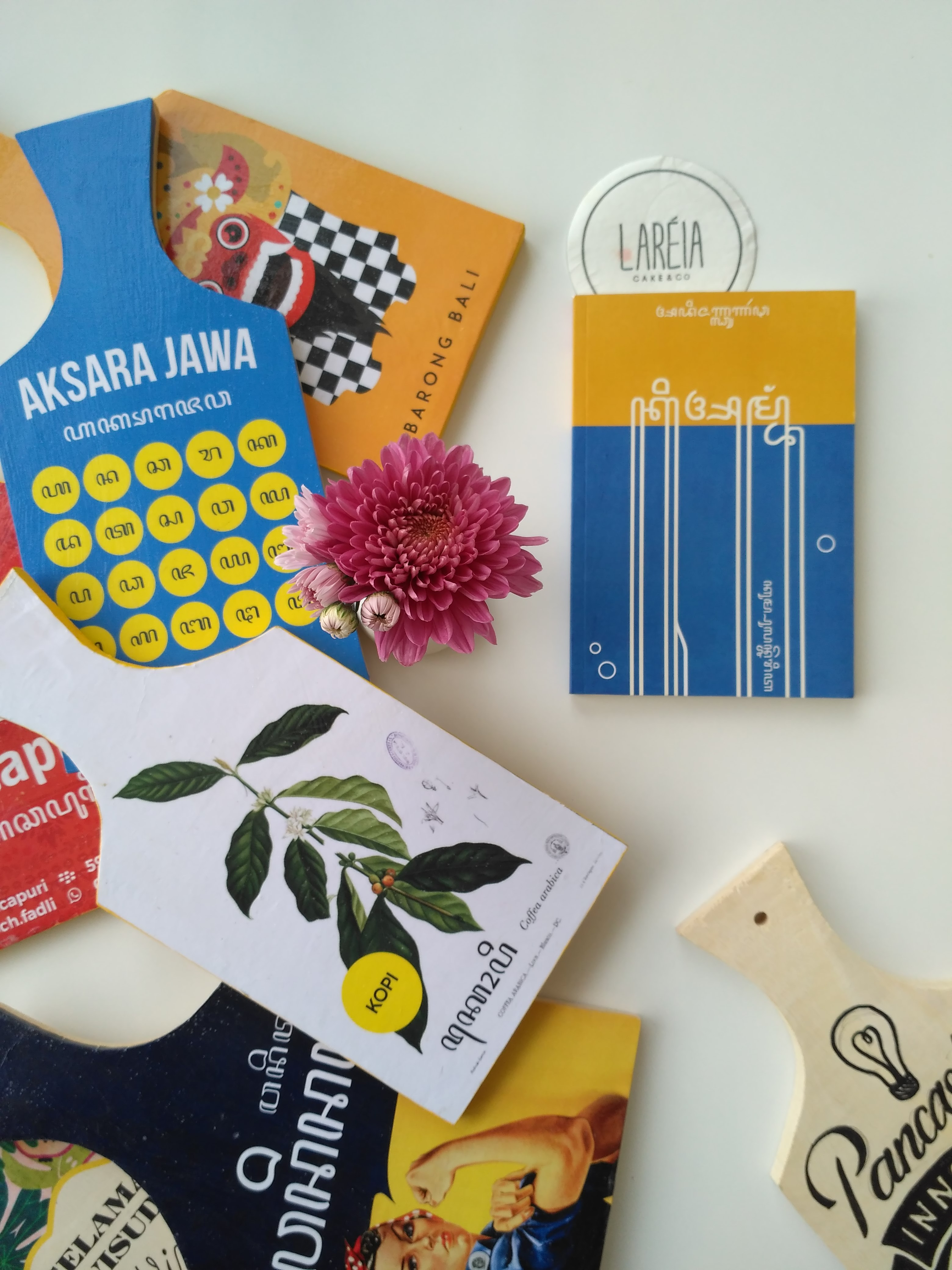
Contemporary merchandise with design elements containing Javanese script

The Yogyakarta Sultanate coat of arms with the Hamengkubuwana royal monogram in Javanese script

== See also ==
- Javanese language
- Javanese literature
- Tuladha Jejeg
