= Nah =

Nah or NAH may refer to:

== Music ==
- "Nah", a 2023 song by Anson Lo
- "Nah", a 2025 song by Khalid

== Places ==
- Naha Airport (Indonesia) (IATA airport code: NAH), Tahuna, Sangir Islands, North Sulawesi, Indonesia
- Nehbandan or Nah, a city in South Khorasan Province, Iran

== Other uses ==
- A form of no, an affirmative particle in the English language; see yes and no
- NaH, the chemical formula of sodium hydride
- Nahuatl (ISO language code: nah), a Uto-Aztecan language spoken in Mexico and El Salvador
- Ix Ek' Naah, a Mayan queen
- Nah Dove (born 1940s), author, lecturer and scholar in African-American studies
