= Na (Chinese state) =

Minor state in Ancient China

Na or Nuo (Chinese: 那; also written as 冉) was a minor vassal state of the Zhou dynasty. Its rulers were from the House of Ji (姬).

== History ==
During the Zhou dynasty in the 11th century BCE, the Duke of Zhou received orders from King Cheng of Zhou to announce an edict concerning descendants of the royal Ji (姬) family. The descendants were given land in the Shihui Bridge (拾回桥) area of Shayang County, where they established the State of Na (那国).

In 704 BCE, King Wu of Chu conquered the State of Na (那国) and the State of Quan (權國), annexing them both into the territory of the State of Chu.

== See also ==
- Duke of Zhou
- King Cheng of Zhou
- King Wu of Chu
