= Ra Jong-yil =

South Korean diplomat and author

- Born: 1940 (age 85–86)
- Education: University of Cambridge (PhD)

Korean name
- Hangul: 라종일
- Hanja: 羅鍾一
- RR: Ra Jongil
- MR: Ra Chongil

Ra Jong-yil (Korean: 라종일; born 1940) is a former South Korean ambassador who has authored books on politics concerning North Korea.

== Education ==
Ra received a PhD at the University of Cambridge.

Ra received a BA and MA from Seoul National University

== Career ==
Ra served as South Korea's ambassador to the United Kingdom from 2001 to 2003 and as its ambassador to Japan from 2004 to 2007. Ra has a lecture within the Faculty of Asian and Middle Eastern Studies, on Korean studies, which has a been active since 2010.

=== Works ===
In 2013, Ra released a book about Kang Min-chul – the only person who ever admitted involvement with an attempt to assassinate the South Korean president in 1983 – whom Ra described as "one of the countless young men sacrificed in the long rivalry between the two Koreas and then forgotten".

Ra's 2016 book, The Path Taken by Jang Song‑thaek: A Rebellious Outsider, made claims that Kim Jong‑il did not intend for his son, Kim Jong‑un, to succeed him after he died.
