= NFA =

NFA may refer to:

== Governmental ==
- National Firearms Act, United States
- National Firearms Agreement, Australia
- Net foreign assets, for taxation purposes
- New Fighter Aircraft Project, Canada

== Organizations ==
- Namibia Football Association
  - NFA-Cup, the Namibia Football Association Cup
- National Farmers Association, former name of Irish Farmers' Association
- National Federation of Anglers, now part of the Angling Trust, United Kingdom
- National Fibromyalgia Association, United States
- National Fire Academy, United States
- National Fire Agency, Taiwan
- National Firearms Association, Canada
- National Flute Association, United States
- National Food Authority (Philippines)
- National Football Academy of Lithuania
- National Forensic Association, United States
- National Forestry Authority, Uganda
- National Fostering Agency, United Kingdom
- National Futures Association, United States
- Native Forest Action, New Zealand
- New Farmers of America
- Newburgh Free Academy, United States
- FK NFA, an association football team in Lithuania
- North Flying (IATA airline code: M3, ICAO airline code: NFA) Danish airline, see List of airline codes (N)
- Norwich Free Academy, United States
- Nigeria Football Association
- Nykøbing Falster Alliancen, now Nykøbing FC, Danish football club

== Science ==
- Nondeterministic finite automaton — in computer science
- Non-fullerene acceptor — in polymer chemistry

== Other uses ==
- N'fa, British-Australian hip hop musician
- Newburgh Free Academy, a public school in Newburgh, New York, US
- No fire area, a region used in the set-up and construction of a kill box
- No fixed abode, not having a fixed geographical location as a residence
- No Fixed Address (band), Australian rock reggae band

== See also ==
- 2NFA
- AFN (disambiguation)
- ANF (disambiguation)
- Fan (disambiguation)
- FNA (disambiguation)
- NAF (disambiguation)
- NFAS (disambiguation)
- NFFA (disambiguation)
