= ANF =

ANF may refer to:

== Companies ==
- ANF (real estate), a French property-management company
- ANF Les Mureaux, a French aircraft manufacturer 1918–1937
- Ateliers du Nord de la France, a French locomotive manufacturer
- Abercrombie & Fitch (NYSE symbol), an American clothing retailer
- Agencia de Noticias Fides, a Bolivian news agency
- Firat News Agency (Ajansa Nûçeyan a Firatê), a Kurdish news agency
- WANF, Atlanta News First, an Atlanta-area CBS television affiliate; formerly CBS 46 (WGCL-TV)

== Federations and other organisations ==
- Association d'entraide de la noblesse française, an official French organization for valid descendants of the French nobility
- Australian Newsagents' Federation, a chain of newsagencies in Australia
- Australian Nursing Federation, the national union for nurses in Australia

== Places ==
- Allegheny National Forest, near Erie, Pennsylvania
- Angeles National Forest, near Los Angeles, California
- Ashurst New Forest railway station (National Rail code), Ashurst, Hampshire, England
- Cerro Moreno Airport (IATA code), Antofagasta, Chile

== Science, technology, mathematics, and medicine ==
- Administrative Normal Form, a representation used in computing
- Agitated Nutsche Filter, a type of filter for liquid
- Algebraic normal form, a method of standardizing and normalizing logical formulas
- Anatolian Neolithic Farmers, an archaeogenetic lineage
- A-normal form, an intermediate representation of programs in functional compilers
- Anti-nuclear antibody, or anti-nuclear factor in blood
- Array Network Facility, a component of the EarthScope USArray project
- Atrial natriuretic peptide, or atrial natriuretic factor, a hormone
- α-Naphthoflavone, a synthetic organic compound

== Other uses ==
- America Needs Fatima, a campaign of the American TFP
- Anti-Narcotics Force, a law enforcement agency in Pakistan
- Ante-Nicene Fathers (book), a collection of English translations of early Christian writings
