= NFAS =

NFAS can mean:

- Non-Facility Associated Signalling, a Primary Rate Interface configuration whereby multiple T1 carriers share a signaling channel (or D channel).
- National Field Archery Society, a UK field archery organisation
- National Football Association of Swaziland, former name of the Eswatini Football Association
- Nuclear Field 'A' School (U.S. Navy), an introductory training academy for Electronics Technician Nuclear Power (ETN), see Electronics technician (United States Navy)

== See also ==
- NFA (disambiguation), for the singular of NFAs
