= AFN =

AFN may refer to:

== Media ==
- American Family News, news site and radio operating as American Family Radio
- American Forces Network, broadcasting network operated by the US Armed Forces
- Asian Food Network, Southeast Asian pay television channel

== Organizations ==
- AFN Limited, manufacturer of the Frazer Nash automobile
- Alaska Federation of Natives
- Assembly of First Nations, in Canada
- Association for Nutrition (AfN), voluntary regulator of nutritionists in the UK
- Athletics Federation of Nigeria

== Other uses ==
- Access and functional needs, a population category in emergency management
- Additional funds needed, a financial concept
- Afghan afghani, ISO 4217 currency code
- Afrique française du Nord, French North Africa, a mid 20th-century term encompassing Tunisia, Morocco and Algeria
- Air Force Network (AFNET), digital information grid owned by Indian Air Force
- Defaka language, a Nigerian language
- Jaffrey Airport–Silver Ranch in New Hampshire, US (IATA airport code AFN)
- Nikon AF-N, a type of Nikon F-mount lens
