= James E. Ferrell =

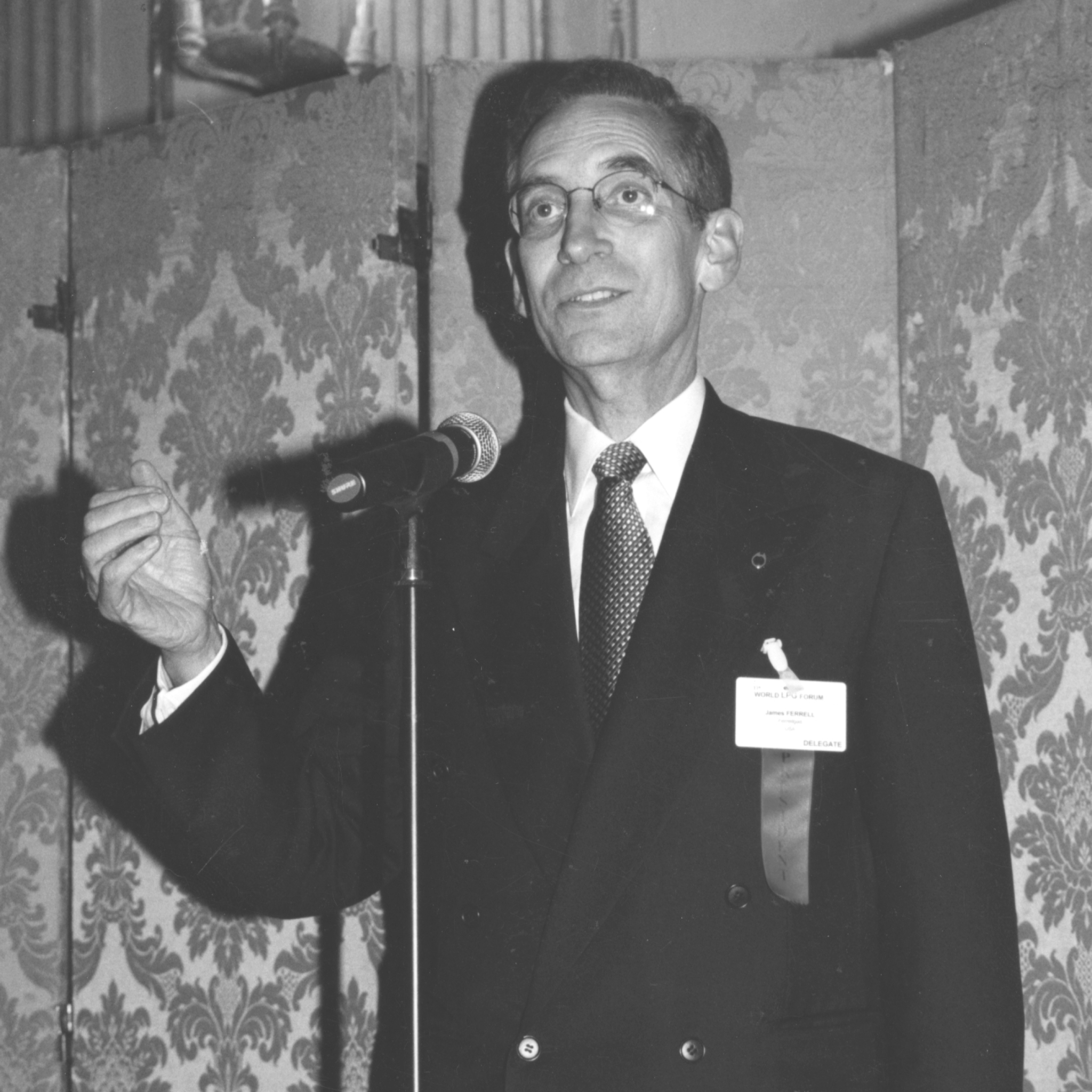
Ferrell addresses audience members in 1998 in Rome after being introduced as President of the World LP Gas Association.

James E. Ferrell is an American businessman. He has served as the Chairman of the Board of Directors of Ferrellgas since 1965, when he assumed leadership from his father, company founder A. C. Ferrell. Since the time he took over, Ferrellgas has grown from a small, independently owned propane company to the second-largest propane retailer in the United States. An active member of the retail propane industry, Ferrell is a past president of the World LP Gas Association and a former chairman of the Propane Vehicle Council. In 2012, he was inducted with the inaugural class into LP Gas magazine's Hall of Fame.

With Elizabeth J. Ferrell, he has created an archive of medieval manuscripts including the Vogüé codex of Guillaume de Machaut, currently on loan to Parker Library of Corpus Christi College, University of Cambridge.

A 1963 graduate of the University of Kansas School of Business, Ferrell has received the Yates Medallion from William Jewell College and the Roundtable Award for Business Achievement from Baker University. He was the 2009 recipient of Ernst & Young's Regional Entrepreneur of the Year Award.
