= Ferrellgas =

American propane company

Ferrellgas Partners, L.P.

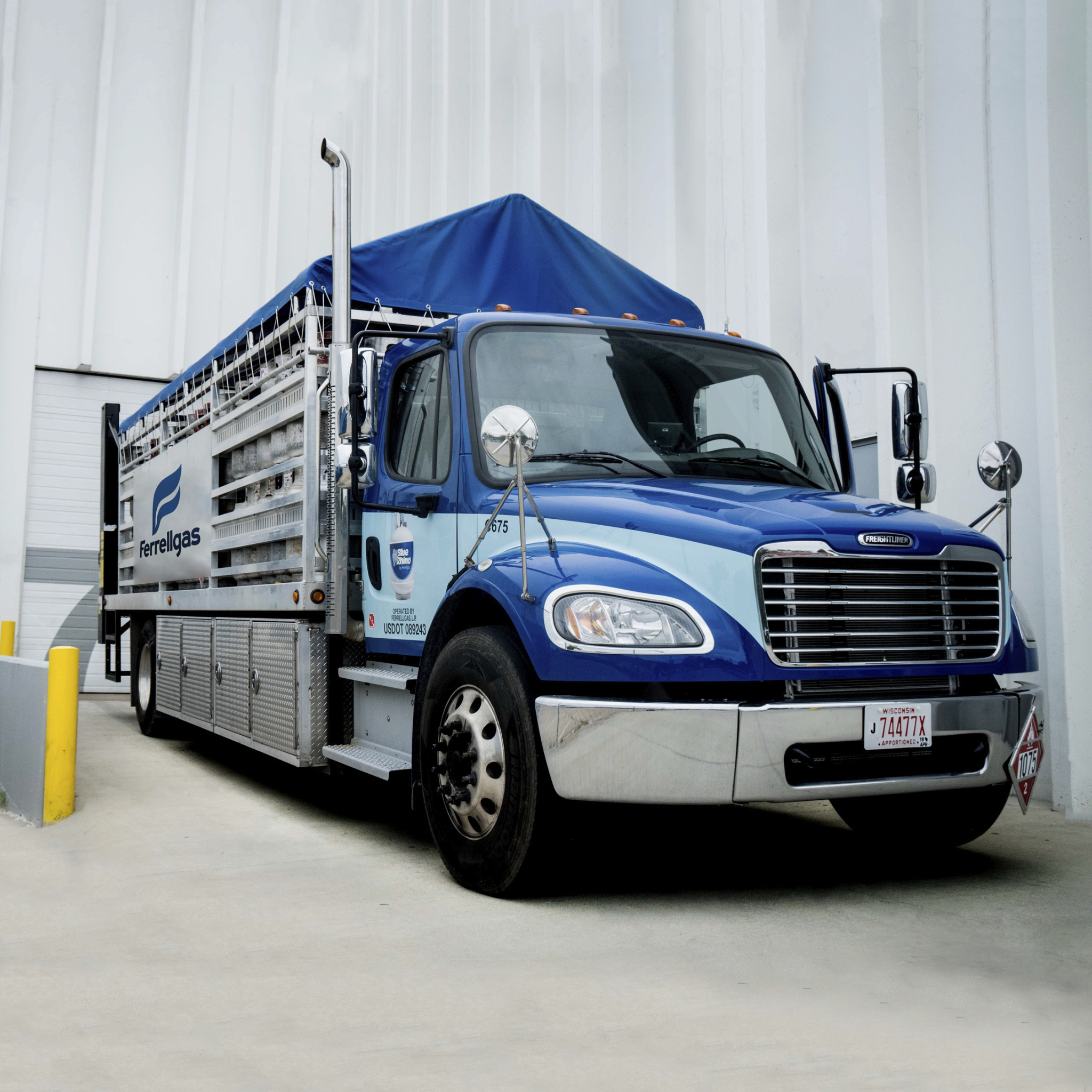
- Type: Master Limited Partnership
- Traded as: OTCID Basic Current: FGPR
- Industry: Retail Propane Distribution
- Founded: 1939; 87 years ago (as A.C. Ferrell Butane Gas Company); Atchison, Kansas, U.S.
- Founder: A.C. Ferrell
- Headquarters: Liberty, Missouri, U.S.
- Key people: James E. Ferrell (Chairman); Tamria A. Zertuche (CEO); Michael E. Cole (CFO)
- Revenue: ▲US$1.94 billion (2025)
- Net income: ▼ −US$15.6 million (2025)
- Number of employees: 3,926 (2024)
- Website: www.ferrellgas.com www.bluerhino.com

Ferrellgas Partners, L.P. is an American supplier of propane founded in 1939 in Atchison, Kansas by A.C. Ferrell. The nationwide company is headquartered in Liberty, Missouri.

== History ==
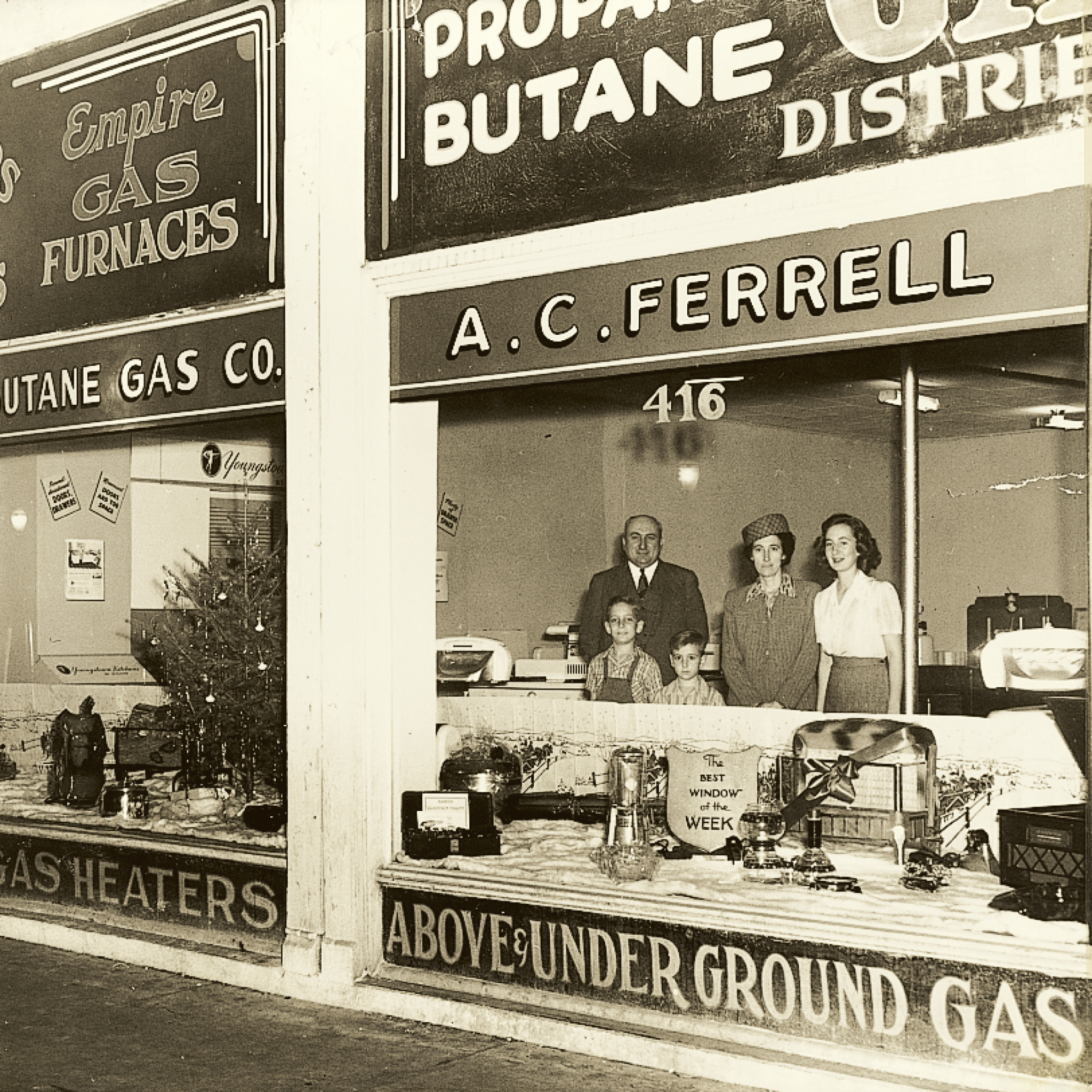
The Ferrell family poses inside the A.C. Ferrell Butane Gas Company office in Atchison, Kansas.

The company was founded in 1939 by Alfred Carl (A.C.) Ferrell in Atchison, Kansas. Established as A.C. Ferrell Butane Gas Company, the business prospered during World War II and the immediate post-war years. The company sold gas heaters and floor furnaces from its storefront on Commercial Street in downtown Atchison. In 1947, A.C. Ferrell erected a bulk plant on a rail siding in East Atchison to help supply bottled gas to local customers. A.C.'s wife, Mabel, was active in the family business, serving as office manager and bookkeeper. The business began a slow, steady decline when Mabel died in 1952. The business continued on, with A.C. electing to diversify by selling furniture and televisions. A massive flood in Atchison in 1958 destroyed much of the company's merchandise, prompting A.C. to move the business from Commercial Street to rented space across the river in Missouri.

A.C. and Mabel's oldest son and middle child, current company Chairman James Ferrell, enrolled in the University of Kansas in 1958. That same year he married a 19-year-old freshman from nearby Benedictine College named Elizabeth (Zibbie). James Ferrell graduated from college in 1963 with a business degree. As an undergraduate, he participated in R.O.T.C. After graduation, he went to Fort Benning, Georgia, to attend infantry school. After being stationed for a year in Korea, James and Zibbie Ferrell moved to Fort Lewis, Washington. It was there in 1965 that James received a letter from A.C. Ferrell asking him to return home to Kansas to help the struggling family business. The company had reverted to selling strictly propane and had dwindled to only four employees.

James Ferrell renamed the company Ferrellgas. The company expanded across the Missouri River to acquire a Rushville, Missouri dealer in 1968. In the next 10 years, the company acquired other Midwestern dealers and established a wholesale operation, and profited amid the energy crises of 1973 and 1979. During that time, the Ferrellgas headquarters shifted, moving first to Platte City, Missouri, before moving further east to Kearney. Its expansion continued, opening Ferrell North America, a propane and feedstock distribution arm, in 1977. To accommodate a growing staff, new offices were constructed in Liberty, Missouri, in 1981 and 1983. Those offices would serve as Ferrellgas' headquarters until 2004, when the company moved its executive offices to nearby Overland Park, Kansas. During the COVID-19 pandemic of 2020, Ferrellgas, like many companies, shuttered some of its offices and shifted its corporate headquarters from Overland Park, Kansas, back to Liberty, Missouri.

=== Purchase of Buckeye Gas Products Company ===
Ferrellgas was not the only propane company in the nation's heartland that was expanding rapidly in the late 1970s and early 1980s. Another such propane retailer was Buckeye Gas Products Company. Buckeye traced its roots to 1886, when Standard Oil Company formed the Buckeye Pipeline Co. to move petroleum products to refineries in northwestern Ohio. By the 1940s, the company was supplying refineries from Chicago to Buffalo, and following World War II, it expanded its pipeline network into New York, New Jersey, and Pennsylvania. In 1964, the Pennsylvania Railroad acquired Buckeye, since most of its pipelines paralleled the railroad's right-of-way across the Mid-Atlantic states. The Pennsylvania Railroad merged with the New York Central Railroad in 1968 when the nation's freight and passenger railroad network was struggling to survive. Three years later, in 1971, the merged Penn Central Railroad filed for the then-largest corporate bankruptcy in American history.

Buckeye, meanwhile, remained one of the bankrupt railroad's more profitable subsidiaries. In the 1970s, the company made a sizable investment in infrastructure, and in 1977, Buckeye expanded into New England with the acquisition of the pipeline company Jet Lines, Inc. In 1986, Penn Central created a master limited partnership to spin off Buckeye and hired Goldman Sachs & Co. to act as lead underwriter. The planned offering did not go well, and Goldman advised management that the placement would go better if Buckeye was split into its pipeline and propane components and sold separately.

A Wall Street banker who James Ferrell met in the early 1980s, who would later become a member of the Ferrellgas Board of Directors, Andy Levison, contacted James Ferrell in 1984 to let him know that Buckeye's propane subsidiary was for sale at an estimated $200 million and asked if he wanted to bid on it. The purchase would elevate Ferrellgas from a regional company to the country's third largest retail propane marketer.

=== The initial public offering ===
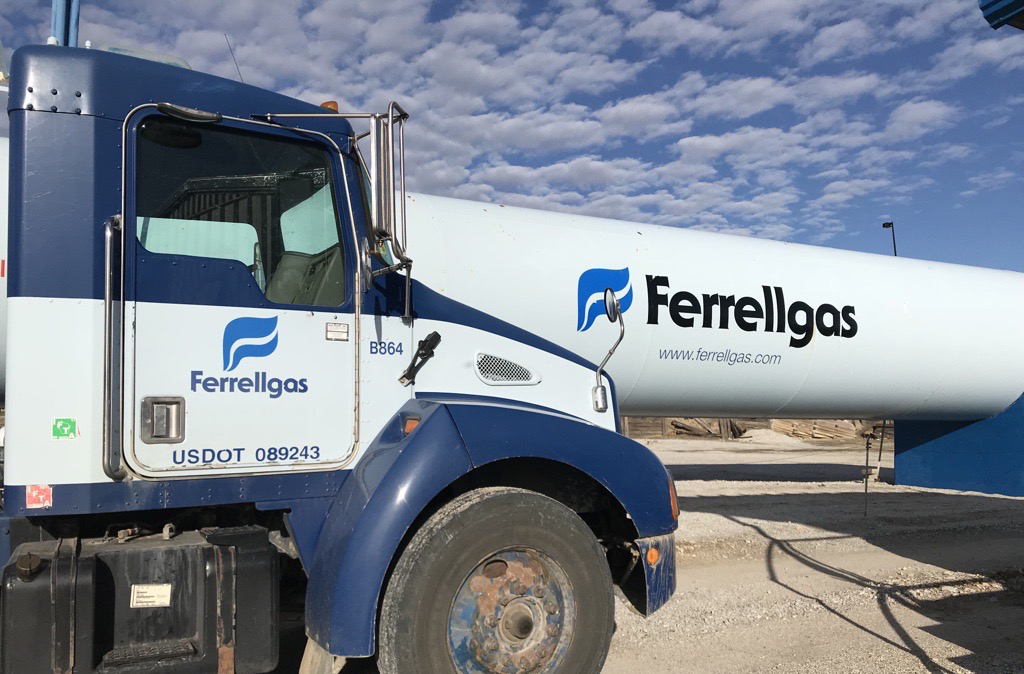
Ferrellgas bobtail delivery truck and bulk storage tank at the company's Lincoln, Nebraska, plant

With the acquisition of Buckeye safely under its belt, Ferrellgas spent the late 1980s and early 1990s consolidating its operations and expanding into new geographical territory. The November 30, 1989 acquisition of DuPane Gas Service operations in Rhode Island was especially exciting. DuPane Gas served 2,600 Rhode Island customers with 1.7 million gallons of propane a year. It gave Ferrellgas its first entry into the competitive and potentially lucrative Northeast market. Ferrellgas continued its acquisition efforts in 1990 and 1991. In the latter year, the company closed 14 acquisitions ranging from the 3.9 million gallons sold by United Cities Propane Gas in Georgia to the 86,000 gallons retailed by Fessler Mill & Hardware in Wisconsin. The company continued its penetration into the Northeast with major acquisitions in New Jersey and Rhode Island.

The need to access capital for acquisitions and internal growth gave James Ferrell the idea to form a Master Limited Partnership (MLP). In June 1994, Ferrellgas issued partnership units of Ferrellgas Partners, L.P. on the New York Stock Exchange (NYSE) under the ticker symbol FGP.

=== Employee stock ownership plan (ESOP) formed ===
In 1998, investment bank Goldman Sachs brought James Ferrell an idea that would help him transition into retirement (although he later returned as Ferrellgas' President and CEO in 2016). The idea was for Ferrell to sell his interest in Ferrellgas to the company's employees in a leveraged Employee Stock Ownership Plan, or ESOP. The plans helped provide tax incentives for the transfer of ownership to a broad base of employees. On July 18, 1998, thousands of Ferrellgas employees gathered in 35 meetings across the United States to learn they had become owners of the company through the establishment of the ESOP. Ferrell appeared in a videotaped presentation to introduce the concept. Ferrellgas continues to celebrate its ESOP today.

Growth through acquisitions continued in the new millennium. On December 1, 2002, Ferrellgas purchased the propane operations of ProAm, Inc., then the nation's 17th largest propane retailer, for $25.6 million and a $10 million deferred seller note. The regional company had 70,000 customers and 57 retail outlets in seven states, the largest concentration of these being in Georgia and Texas. Late 2003 and early 2004 were highlighted by the acquisitions of Aeropres Propane of Bossier City, Louisiana, and Suburban Propane Partners's operations in Texas, Oklahoma, Kansas, and Missouri. Aeropres operated 13 locations and sold 10 million gallons of propane throughout Louisiana and Arkansas. The acquisition of the Suburban locations added 13 million gallons and allowed Ferrellgas to enter Norman, Oklahoma, and Austin, Texas, for the first time.

=== Ferrellgas announces merger agreement with Blue Rhino ===
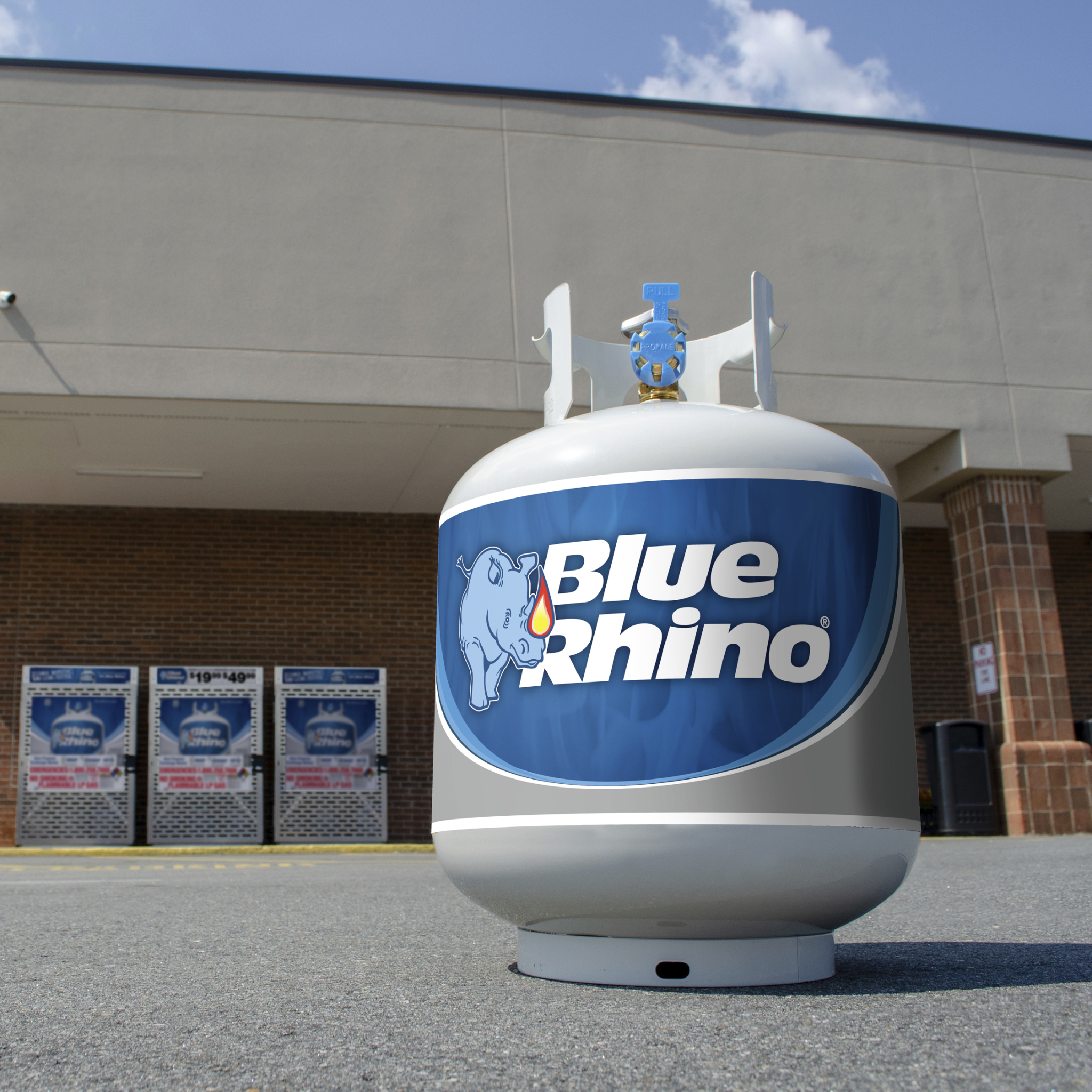
Blue Rhino propane grill tank

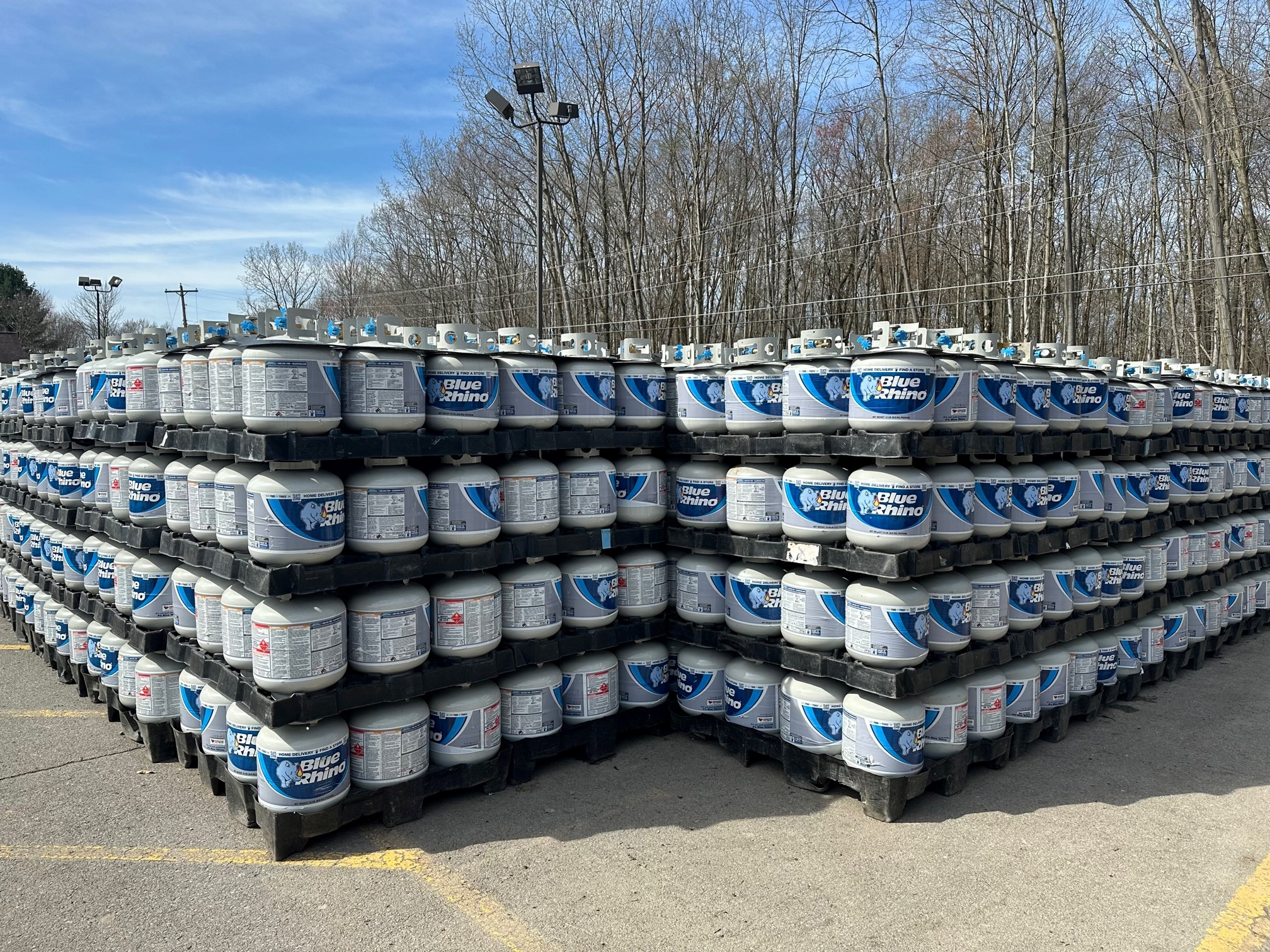
Multiple stacks of Blue Rhino propane tanks lined up in Grove City, Pennsylvania

On February 9, 2004, Ferrellgas announced its blockbuster merger with Blue Rhino Corporation, the nation's largest provider of propane by portable tank exchange. Under the terms of the agreement, Ferrellgas purchased shares of Blue Rhino (the company was traded on the Nasdaq under the symbol RINO) in a transaction worth approximately $340 million. On the day of the merger agreement, James Ferrell called tank exchange the fastest growing portion of the retail propane industry. In 2004 the company had a nationwide exchange network of 29,000 selling locations. That number has since grown to more than 50,000 selling locations. Blue Rhino was founded in 1994, around the same time of Ferrellgas Partners, L.P.'s initial public offering, and remains headquartered in Winston-Salem, North Carolina.

Known mostly for its exchange of 20-pound barbeque grill tanks, Blue Rhino boasts other product lines. Global Sourcing, a company acquired by Blue Rhino in 2000, is the world's largest supplier of barbeque grills. Its products are sold across North America, South America, Europe, and Asia. Global Sourcing products include Uniflame-branded barbeque grills, as well as patio heaters, outdoor fireplaces, mosquito eliminators, charcoal and electric grills, and indoor fireplaces sold under SkeeterVac, Endless Summer, and other private labels. In August 2018, Ferrellgas announced it had completed the sale of its global sourcing business.

In September 2009, James E. Ferrell stepped down as CEO and appointed Steve Wambold, a ten-year company veteran who had served as the company's president and COO since 2005. Ferrell was appointed Interim President and chief executive officer in September 2016 when Wambold stepped down from his roles as president and chief executive officer and as a member of the Board. This was because of the two poor acquisitions noted below which loaded FerrellGas with debt.

=== Blue Rhino propane plant explosion ===
At the Blue Rhino propane plant (LP gas), owned by Ferrellgas, located in Tavares, Florida in Lake County, a fire broke out at around 10:30 p.m EDT on July 29, 2013. This fire lead to multiple explosions within an hour and into the early morning of the next day. The plant contained about 53,000 20-pound propane cylinders (9.1 kg) and multiple large storage tanks. A total of eight workers were injured, some critically.

=== Ferrellgas diversifies with establishment of midstream division ===
On May 1, 2014, Ferrellgas established a midstream division with the purchase of Sable Environmental, LLC and a related entity for $124.7 million. Sable is a privately held fluid logistics provider in the Eagle Ford Shale region of south Texas. Ferrellgas expanded its midstream operations on September 2, 2014, with the purchase of two salt water disposal wells in the Eagle Ford Shale region from C&E Production, LLC and its affiliates, based in Bryan, Texas. The acquisition increased Ferrellgas' salt water disposal wells in the region to eight. After the company's president and CEO James E. Ferrell came out of retirement in 2016, he dispatched the company's non-propane-related assets, including those tied to the purchase of Sable Environmental, LLC.

=== Acquisition of Bridger Logistics ===
In June 2015, Ferrellgas agreed to acquire Bridger Logistics LLC for a fee of around $837.5 million as part of its plans to expand its midstream services business. Ferrellgas went on to sell the assets associated with Bridger Logistics LLC a few years later. In 2018, the company announced it was selling Bridger Energy LLC. Later that year, Ferrellgas announced that it was selling tank rail cars owned by Bridger Rail Shipping LLC. In August 2018, Ferrellgas released the news that it had completed the sale of the remaining Bridger operations and global sourcing business.

== Ownership ==
Although publicly traded on the New York Stock Exchange since 1994, the Ferrell family maintains a presence with the company. James E. Ferrell continues to serve as the company's chairman, and has twice been elected president of the World LP Gas Association. As of October 31, 2017, James E. Ferrell directly or beneficially owned 4,763,475 common units of Ferrellgas Partners, L.P. Ferrellgas employees indirectly own 22,529,361 common units of Ferrellgas Partners, L.P. through an employee stock ownership plan. As part of a financial restructuring in 2021, there are currently 4.9 million Class A units outstanding.

On December 30, 2019, the company de-listed its FGP symbol from the NYSE and listed its public shares on the OTCQB Pink Sheet exchange with the symbol FGPR. This change was necessitated because the average closing price of the company's common stock over a consecutive 30-day trading period had remained less than $1.00, which is an NYSE listing requirement.

Ferrellgas is still traded on the OTC market under the FGPR symbol. After completing a prepackaged Chapter 11 bankruptcy restructuring in 2021, Ferrellgas reported net earnings of $148.86 million for fiscal year 2022. It was the company's first profitable fiscal year since 2015.

== Locations ==
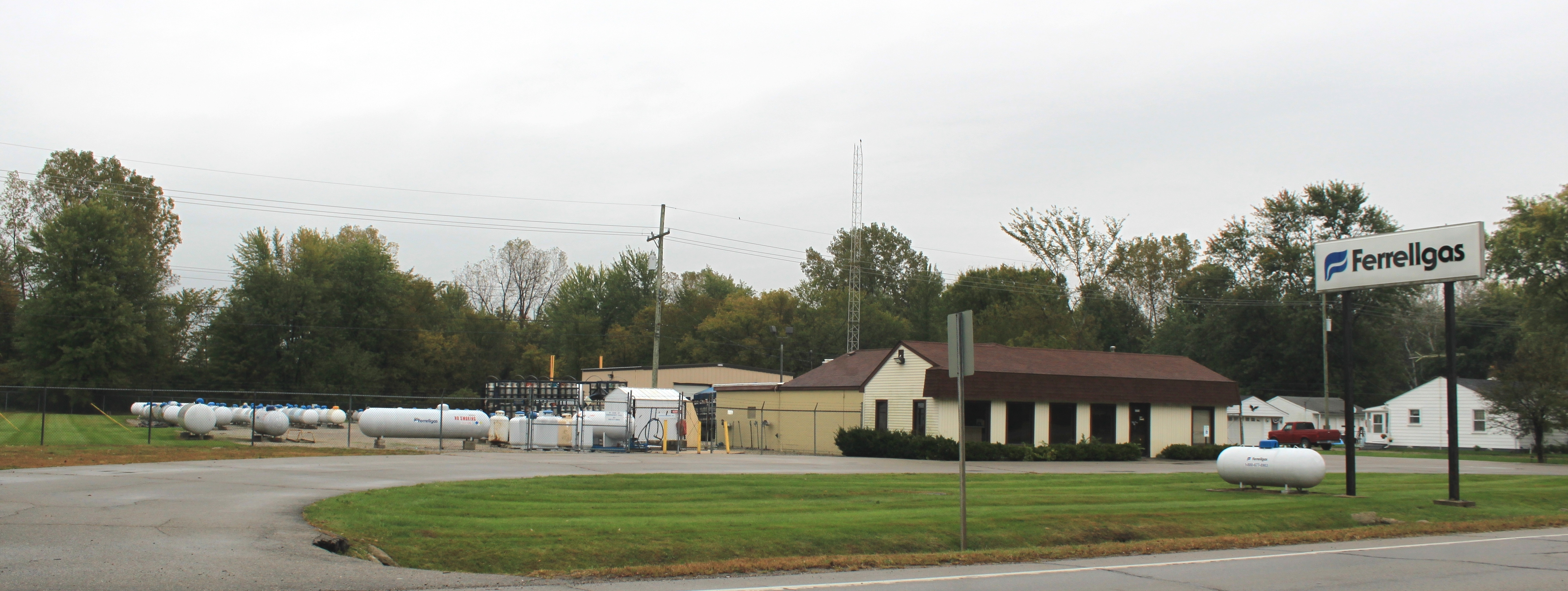
Ferrellgas retailer, Sumpter Township, Michigan

According to the 10-K filed by the company on September 30, 2022, Ferrellgas has 795 propane distribution locations in all 50 states and the District of Columbia in addition to Blue Rhino locations in Puerto Rico.
