= NFFA =

NFFA may refer to:

- Ba Airport (IATA airport code: NFFA), an airport in Ba, Viti Levu, Fiji
- National Field Archery Association
- National Foundation for Advancement in the Arts
- New Founding Fathers of America, a fictional political party in the dystopian franchise The Purge
- No Fun at All, a Swedish punk rock band
- Nuclear-Free Future Award, an award given for anti-nuclear activism
- National Foundation for Advancement in the Arts

== See also ==
- NFA (disambiguation)
