= FNA =

FNA may refer to:

- Algerian National Front (French: Front National Algérien)
- β-FNA, (beta-funaltrexamine), an opioid antagonist
- Farmers of North America, a Canadian agricultural company
- Fars News Agency, in Iran
- Fédération Française Aéronautique, a French aeroclub association
- Fellow of the Indian National Science Academy
- Ferrell North America, an American propane company
- Filipino Nurses Association, now the Philippine Nurses Association
- Fine-needle aspiration
- Flora of North America, a multivolume botanical work
- Fondo Nacional de las Artes (National Endowment for the Arts), in Argentina
- Guatemalan Athletics Federation (Spanish: Federación Nacional de Atletismo de Guatemala)
- Lungi International Airport, in Sierra Leone
- Nicaraguan Athletics Federation (Spanish: Federación Nicaragüense de Atletismo)
- Norlandair, an Icelandic airline
- a free, open-source reimplementation of the Microsoft XNA Game Studio libraries
