= Additional funds needed =

Additional funds needed (AFN) is a financial concept used when a business looks to expand its operations. Since a business that seeks to increase its sales level will require more assets to meet that goal, some provision must be made to accommodate the change in assets. To phrase it another way, the business must have some plan to actually finance the new assets that will be needed to increase sales.

== Calculation ==
AFN is a way of calculating how much new funding will be required, so that the firm can realistically look at whether or not they will be able to generate the additional funding and therefore be able to achieve the higher sales level. Determining the amount of external funding needed is a key part of calculating AFN.

A simplified version of the AFN equation is as follows:

AFN = Projected increase in assets – spontaneous increase in liabilities – any increase in retained earnings

When calculating AFN, consideration must be given to whether the company is already operating at full capacity; if not, they can expand sales some without having to invest in new equipment.

If a negative value is found for AFN, that means that the action would generate extra income that could be invested elsewhere.

The AFN equation is as follows:

AFN = (A*/S_{0})ΔS – (L*/S_{0})ΔS – MS_{1}(RR)

Where:

- A* = Assets tied directly to sales and will increase
- L* = Spontaneous liabilities that will be affected by sales. (NOTE: Not all liabilities will be affected by sales such as long-term debt)
- S_{0} = Sales during the last year
- S_{1} = Total sales projected for next year (the new level of sales).
- ΔS = The increase in sales between S_{0} and S_{1}
- M = Profit margin, or the profit per unit of sales
- MS_{1} = Projected Net Income
- RR = The retention ratio from Net Income and is also calculated as (1 – payout ratio)

The relevant ratios within the formula are:

- (A*/S_{0}): Called the capital intensity ratio
- (L*/S_{0}): Called the spontaneous liabilities ratio
