= Australian Newsagents' Federation =

Australian Newsagents' Federation is a trade association representing newsagents in Australia.

Newsagents have been represented by state-based industry bodies for over 100 years and in 1995 a national secretariat, The Australian Newsagents’ Federation, was established in Sydney. IT represents newsagents to government and industry, provides communication, education and training as well as an Awards Program for members. Branches exist in WA, SA, NT, Tasmania and Queensland and close ties are held with the NSW & ACT and Victorian organisations.

ANF is a major Western Union network agent for the newsagency channel, since 2003. The ANF is also developing a parcel network, CONNECT, throughout Australia. There are 4000 newsagency outlets Australia-wide.
