= Non-fullerene acceptor =

Non-fullerene acceptors (NFAs) are types of acceptors used in organic solar cells (OSCs). The name Fullerene comes from another type of acceptor-molecule which was used as the main acceptor material for bulk heterojunction Organic solar cells. Non-fullerene acceptors are thus defined as not being a part of this sort of acceptors.

Research in non-fullerene acceptors did not show promising results starting up when being compared to fullerene based organic solar cells. However, recent developments in this field launched a series of new opportunities for the NFA based OSCs. The most important breakthrough was the development of the small molecule acceptors (SMAs). These acceptors are showing promising results to be better alternatives for Fullerene acceptors because of their properties. The property that makes these SMAs such a big research topic is their tunability. SMAs can be modified to a much greater extent than Fullerene acceptors. There are, however, still many improvements to make on the design of the SMAs in order become profitable to use in OSCs.

Recent research on designing NFA-OSCs showed an efficiency of 15% with a so-called tandem solar cell which made use of Non-fullerene acceptors as well as fullerene acceptors. With a good chance that researchers will be able to boost this percentage up to 18%, it is clear that NFA-OSCs have a great potential in becoming a profitable photovoltaic in commercial application.

== NFA Potential ==
=== Advantages ===
Fullerene acceptors (FAs) have been used extensively in OSCs. This is rationalized by several characteristics of fullerenes. The three-dimensional character causes them to be suitable materials for bulk heterojunction structures. Additionally, its electronic configuration (delocalized LUMOs) allows for efficient percolation and high electron mobility. Another consequence is that they are easily coupled to compatible donor polymers. However, fullerene acceptor organic solar cells (FA-OSCs) encounter a limited efficiency. The energy levels in fullerene compounds are relatively constant and difficult to alter. Moreover, they employ weak absorption in the visible spectrum and the near-infrared spectrum and low thermal instability and photochemical instability. The acceptors need to be purified extensively, adding to the economical and temporal disadvantages of using FAs.

The organic NFAs, in the form of small molecular acceptors (SMAs), can be used to overcome these fullerene deficiencies. They have more structural degrees of freedom, allowing higher electron affinity tunability; they absorb incidental visible-NIR radiation more strongly; they are more stable; they are compatible with donor polymers and they are (in general) easier to synthesize. NF-OSCs with power conversion efficiencies (PCE) of over 13% have been reported, reaching a higher value than its FA-based counterpart.

=== Disadvantages ===
One of the downsides of using SMAs is the fact that, under atmospheric conditions, they tend to engage in disordered (anisotropic) states as a result of their planar structures. They are often planar as aromaticity is required for sufficient electron mobility. The lack of order may diminish electron transport and effective extraction routes that lead to induced current. Moreover, the corresponding lack of orientation affects donor-acceptor exciton formation. This makes them less compatible for bulk heterojunction blends than FAs. Another downside to research on SMA usage is the profound scala of possibilities of donor-acceptor pairs that scientists are challenged to induce.

== Physics ==
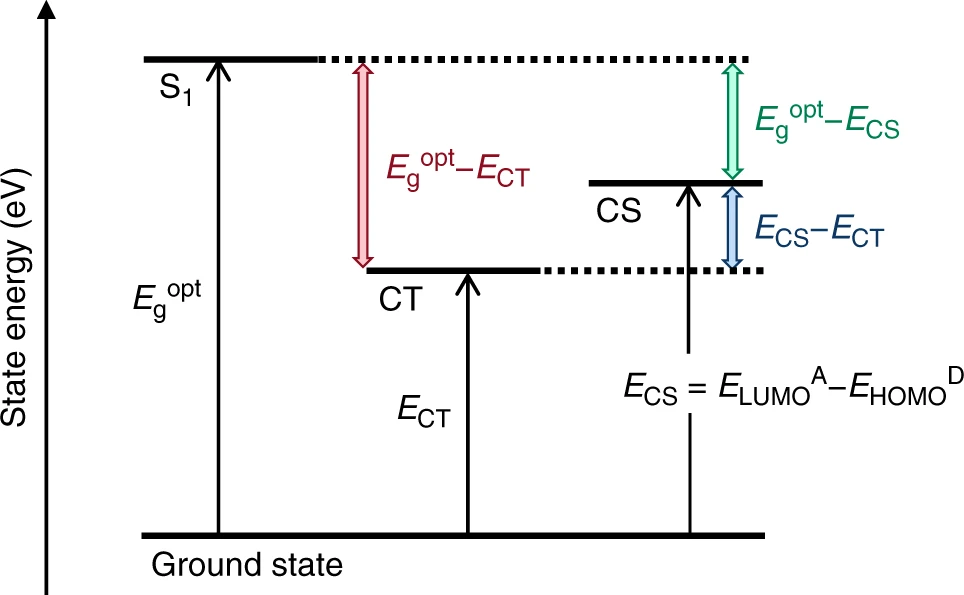
Schematic of energy states in organic solar cells

The mechanism of current induction in organic solar cells involves a charge transfer. After electromagnetic absorption and exciton formation in the electron donor polymer, the excited electron is moved towards the acceptor conduction band (LUMO) as a result of the lower energy value than the donor LUMO. This process is called a charge separation, and the corresponding energy value $E_{CS}$ satisfies $E_{CS} = E^A_{LUMO} - E^D_{HOMO}$ where CS denotes charge separation, A denotes the acceptor and D denotes the donor molecule. Along with the Coulombic potential that needs to be surpassed, the maximum energy obtained from the process is defined as the Charge Transfer energy, $E_{CT}$. The difference between the optical excitation energy (the optical band gap energy, $E^{opt}_g$) and the charge transfer energy is the driving force of the system.

An advantage of NF-OSCs over current fullerene-based OSCs is that the SMAs used are relatively compatible with donors, as a result of their electronic affinity tunability. Their compatibility originates from their LUMO-energy value similarity. The driving force is minimized to solely Coulombic contributions (<0.3 eV) with negligible charge separation loss. This results in low potential spillage, $V_{loss}$, which depends explicitly on the value of the driving force, along with radiative and non-radiative losses during the current induction process. Thus, for NF-OSCs, $E_{loss} = qV_{loss}$, with q the electron's charge, is minimized, leading to a higher useful energy output. The result is a high open-circuit voltage $V_{OC}$ of the solar cell compared to fullerene counterparts, with reports of values as high as 1.1V. However, the diminished charge separation energy cost negatively influences the tendency of excited electrons in the donor conduction band to transport to the acceptor LUMO as it is less preferred energetically. This gives rise to the fact that electrons induced in the current are more energetic, but fewer electrons are induced. This means that the short-circuit current density $J_{SC}$ and the fill factor (FF) are decreased. In terms of the PCE, the higher open-circuit voltage is compensated by the lower short-circuit current density and fill factor. Researchers showed that ultrafast charge separation is possible with negligible driving force. In fact, the electrical external quantum efficiency $EQE_{EL}$ is highest for donor-acceptor blends with lowest driving force.

== Types ==
One of the main advantages of the non-fullerene acceptors is their ability to be tuned and customized by chemical modification. This in contrary to fullerene acceptors. It also immediately creates a bottleneck because of the huge amount of possibilities there are which could be applied as an SMA. A wide variety of SMAs are tested to be a successful acceptor, but two classes of SMAs have proven to give the best results concerning Power Conversion Efficiency (PCE) and have made the greatest attribute to the recent development in NFA-OSCs.

=== Rylene diimides ===
Rylene diimides are, as said, one of the two main subclasses which are a basis for acceptor-molecules in modern NFA-OSCs. Rylene diimides are industrial dyes and can be divided into, once again, two subclasses: Perylene Diimides (PDIs) and Naphthalene Diimides (NDIs). Rylene diimides consist of a planar rylene framework and numerous constructions can be made by attaching certain subgroups and by using more PDI molecules in one acceptor. The mono-PDI molecule is shown in the figure on the right.

The basic structure of perylene diimides.

Rylene diimides are considered good acceptors because of their favourable properties. Rylene diimides usually have high electron mobility values $\mu_e$ due to intermolecular π-stacking. These values are comparable to ones of fullerene acceptors. Furthermore, Rylene diimides also have a high absorbance spectrum in the visible area, high thermal and oxidative stability and their electric affinities can be tuned to a great extent by adding side groups and 3D-structure which leads to a significant higher open-circuit voltage ($V_{oc}$) Challenges that must be faced by designing and improving Rylene diimides based OSCs are mainly concerned by synthesis of PDIs because the planar structure of the molecule makes that it tends to aggregate into a crystal structure. This greatly enhances the domain size, larger than the preferred 20 nm, in the bulk heterojunction which leads to a lower charge transport ability. Researchers have tried to reduce this aggregation by three structure adaptions, all focused on enhancing the mobility of Rylene diimides molecules. The first approach is to link two PDI molecules with a single carbon bond, to form a so-called twisted dimer. The second synthesis forms highly twisted 3D-structures of PDI molecules and the third approach forms a fused-ring structure. For all three possible ways, an example molecule is shown in the figure below. These derivatives are examples of acceptor-molecules which were tested and assessed in OSCs for their performance and PCE. Future research will focus on developing better PDIs resulting in higher PCE values for the OSC.

Three PDI based SMAs constructed using three different synthesis to decrease the domain size in the BHJ

=== Fused-ring electron acceptors ===
Fused-ring electron acceptors (FREAs) are completely different from Rylene diimides. They consist of two electron withdrawing groups in between of a donor group. This donor group is a π-bridge of fused aromatic rings. FREAs have values for $\mu_e$ similar to those of fullerene acceptors and have a wide absorption range. Electron affinities can be tuned by substituting the side chains, the core and the end groups. Current research focusses on designing the best FREA with varying all these groups. Another development issue is the expensive synthesis of these molecules. Finding the most efficient synthetic route is therefore also an important subject concerning these acceptors

== Future development ==
In current research, rylene diimides (for small band-gap energy donors) and FREAs (for large band-gap energy donors) have shown the most potential for becoming commercially viable solar cell materials for bulk heterojunction blend cells. Wide band gap donors are known to enhance voltage and diminish current density, but in combination with FREAs both values can be relatively high.

There are still a lot of improvements to be made before an NFA-OSC can be commercially profitable. First of all, the PCE should be increased to at least 15% since this is the minimal value for commercial application. As said, PCEs already have exceeded 13% so recent development is on the right track. PCEs can be increased by designing even better NFAs, for instance, on the level of electron mobility NFAs still can increase a lot compared to FAs ( $3.3 \cdot 10^{-4} cm^2 V^{-1} s^{-1}$ for the best NFAs compared to $7.0 \cdot 10^{-4} cm^2 V^{-1} s^{-1}$ for the best FAs). Improvements can also be made in the following aspects: better donor matching, tandem constructions, BHJ morphology and domain purity of the donor and acceptor.

Besides these theoretical research aspects, implementation in a life size commercial solar cell also brings a lot of challenges, such as easy and sustainable device fabrication methods and long-term stability of the organic compounds. Studies also show that with upscaling, the PCE in general drops. On all of these areas, NFA-OSCs show great potential but it will take a lot of research before a solid non-fullerene acceptor-organic solar cell can compete with inorganic solar cells.

== See also ==
- Rylene dye
