= Agencia de Noticias Fides =

Bolivian news agency

- Industry: News media
- Founded: 5 August 1963; 62 years ago
- Headquarters: La Paz, Bolivia
- Area served: National
- Products: Wire service
- Website: noticiasfides.com

Agencia de Noticias Fides (ANF) is a Bolivian private news agency apostolate of the Society of Jesus headquartered in La Paz, Bolivia. Founded in 1963 by José Gramunt De Moragas, it is Bolivia's oldest news agency, distributing reports on political, economic, and social events, to a majority of the news media.
