= Ferrell North America =

American propane company

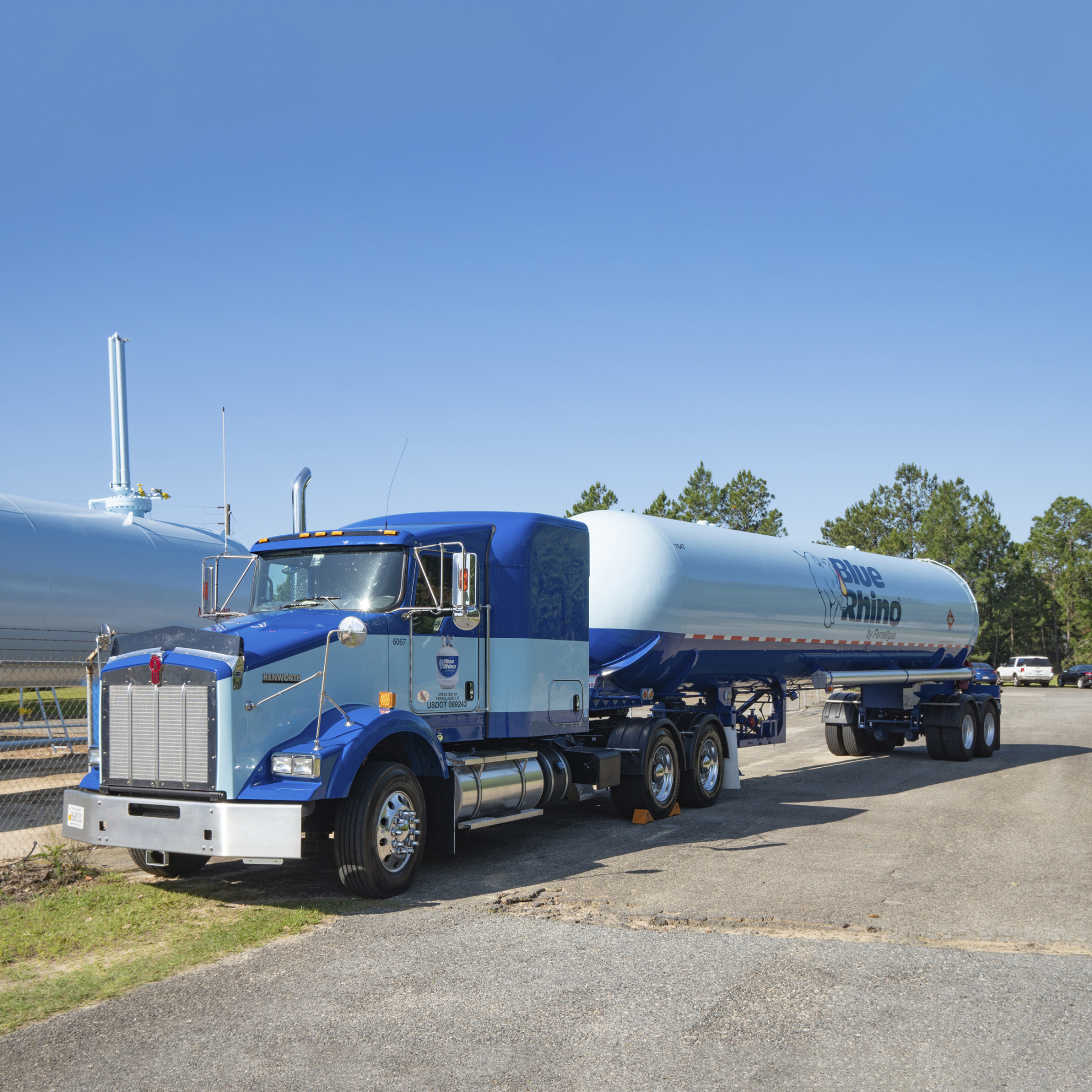
- Ferrell North America transport truck
- Type: Division of Ferrellgas (NYSE: FGP)
- Founded: 1977
- Headquarters: Overland Park, Kansas, United States
- Website: www.fna.com

Ferrell North America performs propane trading and distribution for more than 600 Ferrellgas locations. Founded in Houston, Texas in 1977, Ferrell North America also purchases, trades, sells, stores, and transports natural gas liquids and oil refinery feedstocks in conjunction with major oil companies, petrochemical manufacturers, gas processors, and other retail propane companies.

Ferrell North America moved its operations from Houston to the Ferrellgas corporate headquarters in Overland Park, Kansas in 2005.
