= NMN =

NMN may refer to:

- National Monuments Council
- Nicotinamide mononucleotide
- Nigerian Merchant Navy
- Numbered musical notation
- "No middle name", sometimes used in legal documents for people with no middle name
- NMN, the National Rail station code for New Mills Newtown railway station, Derbyshire, England
- nmn, the ISO 639 code for the Taa language
