= Odumegwu =

- Gender: Male
- Language(s): Igbo

Origin
- Word/name: Nigeria
- Meaning: it is marvelous in my sight

Odumegwu is a Nigerian surname. Notable people with the surname include:

- Bianca Odumegwu-Ojukwu (born 1968), Nigerian businesswoman and lawyer
- Chukwuemeka Odumegwu Ojukwu (1933–2011), Nigerian politician and military leader
- Kenneth Odumegwu (born 2000), Nigerian American football player
- Louis Odumegwu Ojukwu (1909–1966), Nigerian businessman
