= Nigerian National Shipping Line =

Shipping line of Nigeria

- Type: Shipping line
- Founded: 1959
- Defunct: 1995
- Headquarters: Lagos, Nigeria
- Owner: Nigerian government

The Nigerian National Shipping Line (NNSL) was established by the Nigerian government in 1959. Despite heavy investment and subsidies, the state-owned company was unable to compete with European lines. Much of the investment went to enriching the political elite. Deeply indebted, the NNSL was liquidated in 1995 and all 21 of its vessels were sold.

== Formation ==
Nigeria formed the NNSL in 1957. At first 33% of the capital was held by the Elder Dempster Line and 16% by the Palm Line, both British companies, while the Nigerian government held 51%. In 1961, the Nigerian government acquired all the shares.

The NNSL started operations in 1959 with three vessels. Nigerian seamen who had been employed by British shipping companies in the colonial era moved to work for the Nigerian Line.The public company was assisted by private businessmen, such as tycoon Sir Louis Ojukwu, who was an early member of the board, before dying in 1966.

By 1966 the fleet had grown to a total of nine vessels. The chairman from 1967 to 1973 was Oloye Adekunle Ojora, formerly of the United Africa Company, who later became a highly successful businessman in his own right.

== Expansion ==
During the Nigerian Civil War the army made free use of the NNSL for transport of troops. The ships played a key role in the advances along the coast in 1969. With the end of the Civil War in January 1970, General Yakubu Gowon announced an extensive program to revive the economy. In place of expensive hired vessels, two new ships were bought for the NNSL and the ports at Calabar and Port Harcourt were rehabilitated. In 1977 the government ordered construction of 19 new vessels to replace the aging fleet. By 1979 the company had 24 oceangoing ships. The NNSL was an important source of training for seamen of the Nigerian Merchant Navy.

In January 1980 President Shehu Shagari talked to reporters about his first 100 days in office. He said that during this period the NNSL increased its percentage of imported goods from about 8% to 11.3% and had started bringing in components for the Peugeot assembly plant in Kaduna, components that had previously been flown in. On a less positive note, heroin smuggling by crew members was a significant issue in the 1970s and 1980s, with Nigeria serving as a major transit point for drugs bound for Europe.

== Decline ==
A 1987 study of the NNSL for the World Bank compared results to the benefits that the United Nations Conference on Trade and Development had estimated would come from the entry of Nigeria into shipping. The findings were that the investment had made no significant contribution to Gross Domestic Product, employment, the balance of payments, exercising countervailing power, national security or the country's image. The gains had been less than the opportunity costs of the resources used.

In 1988 the National Maritime Authority granted six Nigerian shipping lines "national carrier" status, including the state-owned Nigerian National Shipping Line. The NMA planned to extend this status to more domestic companies so as to reduce control of trade by foreign-owned lines. The Shipping Policy Decree of 1987, which established the NMA, gave approval for a 50–50 share between foreign and domestic lines for non-conference cargos. However, in 1988 the 24 ships of Nigerian national carriers, including the NNSL, took only 11% of the cargos at Nigerian ports. The NNSL and the private companies suffered from financial problems and lacked the facilities needed to attract cargos. In the 1990s several of the company's vessels were seized in different parts of the world for alleged breach of contract and unpaid bills.

== Successor ==
The NNSL was liquidated in September 1995. Its assets were assumed by the newly formed National Unity Line (NUL). The NUL, fully owned by the Nigeria Maritime Authority, began commercial operations in July 1996 as Nigeria's national flag carrier. The NUL had just one ship, MV Abuja. In August 2005 the government put the NUL up for sale. The company now had no vessels, but owned a shipping license. In July 2010 it was reported that the Nigerian Maritime Administration and Safety Agency, the successor to the NMA, had completed arrangements to establish a new national shipping line for Nigeria. A fresh attempt was made to relaunch and sell the NUL in 2011.
