= Nigerian Merchant Navy =

The Nigerian Merchant Navy (NMN) consists of ships, their crew and supporting organizations owned by Nigerians and engaged in cabotage and international trade with Nigeria.

== Origins ==
The quasi-military Nigerian Marine Department was established in 1914 and cooperated with the Royal Navy in capturing Cameroon in the First World War. The Nigerian Navy came into official existence in 1956, staffed by 200 people from the Marine Department, with the tasks of mine-sweeping, ports examination and naval control services. The Nigerian Marine Training School, established in April 1952, provided basic training in seamanship to the Navy, Merchant Navy, Inland Waterways Department and Nigerian Ports Authority. The Nigerian National Shipping Line was established by the Nigerian government in 1959. Despite heavy investment and subsidies, the state-owned company was unable to compete with European lines. Much of the investment went to enriching the political elite.

A 1964 book describes careers in the Nigerian Merchant Navy, which offered apprenticeships for craftsmen and Officer Cadetships for aspirants to become Navigating or Engineering officers. In 1988 the National Maritime Authority granted six Nigerian shipping lines "national carrier" status, including the state-owned Nigerian National Shipping Line, the Nigerian Green Line, Africa Ocean Line, Nigerbras Shipping Line, Brawal Line and the Nigerian South American Line. The NMA had plans to extend this status to more domestic companies so as to reduce control of trade by foreign-owned lines. However, by 1992 foreign shippers were carrying over 80% of cargo. The oil extraction companies ignored rules to use Nigerian ships and instead supplied their own tankers to transport most of the crude to their refineries abroad.

The industry has been represented at international conferences by members of the Merchant Navy Officers' and Water Transport Senior Staff Association. Thomas Kemewerigha, the national President of this association, described it in a 2010 interview as a trade union organization affiliated with the Trades Union Congress (TUC) and with the International Transport Workers' Federation (ITF).

== Status and activities ==
Although the Nigerian Merchant Navy has a long history, it is not a legally recognized body. The Nigerian Maritime Administration and Safety Agency (NIMASA) undertook an investigation in 2007 after hearing that President Olusegun Obasanjo had authorized establishment of a Nigeria Merchant Navy Corps. In November 2007 the Director General of NIMASA said in a letter to Presidency that "the so-called Nigerian Merchant Navy is not known in the law establishing the NIMASA (NIMASA ACT 2007) nor the Nigerian Merchant Shipping Act 2007 that delegated the function of the Maritime Safety Administration to NIMASA".

When the police announced a ban of an organization calling itself the "Nigerian Merchant Navy" in July 2010, due to alleged illegal activities of some members of that organization, Kemewerigha said the ban did not apply to his Nigerian Merchant Navy Officers and Water Transport Senior Staff Association, which was recognized in the Federal Gazette. He said "We have written a lot of letters as far back as 2006, when we discovered a mystery Merchant Navy body. We wrote to the Police, Navy, SSS and every other agency but nothing was done".

Kemewerigha describes the Merchant Navy job as being "in water transportation, cargo vessels, tankers, creek operations, inland water ways, offshore, service vessels, harbour handling, FPSO's". He talked against the use of uniforms on land, which his organization did not allow. He said that cadets wore the uniform, which is the same as the Navy uniform apart from the badge, so they could get free transport.

The Merchant Navy suffers from lawlessness in the territorial waters. In July 2010, Comrade Kingsley Enahoro issued a statement reading in part: "The Executive and entire members of the fishing zone of the Nigeria Merchant Navy want to bring to the notice of the Federal/State Government as well as the International community and the General Public of the threat and killing suffered by sailors as a result of the insurgence of sea pirates in the Nigeria/Cameroon waters". Kemewerigha has been highly critical of NIMASA, which is meant to protect merchant vessels, saying that despite all the money received by NIMASA they were unable to maintain one helicopter in flight-worthy condition. In May 2011 the Nigerian Senate was considering a bill for an Act to Provide for the Establishment of the Nigerian Merchant Navy Security and Safety Corps.

== Unauthorized organizations ==
In November 2009 the Nigerian Tribune published a report titled "Navy uncovers plot to destabilise Nigeria" that said the Nigerian Naval Command had reported discovery of plans by a group headed by Commodore Benson Edema to destabilise the country. The Navy was quoted as saying that the group had allegedly recruited youths and trained them in use of arms, dressing them in naval uniforms. This appears to have related to an earlier incident in December 2007 where "Commodore" Benson Edema was transferred to the custody of Nigerian Navy after being arrested for allegedly assaulting men of the Lagos State Transport Management Authority. Edema claimed he had recruited 10,000 men to his "Nigerian Merchant Navy Corps" with the job of policing the nation’s waterways. Edema, who was never a Navy Commodore but had been a welder with Nigerian National Shipping Line (NNSL) from 1994 to 1996, was arrested for alleged impersonation.

Responding to the Tribune report, the Director-General of the self-styled Nigerian Merchant Navy, Commodore Allen Edema, called for President Umaru Yar'Adua to investigate the Nigerian Navy, implying it might be involved in import of illegal arms, contraband and hard drugs. Edema describing the Tribune report as a "baseless tissues of lies meant to mislead the public, incite public hatred and misgiving against the Nigeria Merchant navy who go about their legitimate business within the law". Edema went on to claim the Navy was involved in various illegal activities. He also accused the Nigerian Maritime Administration and Safety Agency of accepting pay-offs from foreign-owned ships who should have been employing Nigerian seamen. He agreed that the NMA had been engaged in training, but said the training was in seafaring and basic maritime safety and security.

In August 2010 "Commodore" Aderemi Olatinwo, Director-General of the Nigerian Merchant Navy, called for formal recognition of an autonomous Merchant Navy to undertake coast guard duties. According to Olatinwo, Nigeria has the most porous coast in the world, with stolen crude oil being smuggled out and arms and other contraband smuggled in. In a May 2011 interview the head of the NMN Lagos command, Captain Ichukwu Agaba, said the NMN originated with the colonial Marine Department, which had the function of ensuring safety on the waterways, stopping piracy and preventing foreign invasion. He noted there were "strong arm politics in play to outlaw the merchant navy", and said the NMN had been fighting their ejection from their Lagos premises since 2009. Agaba said NMN crew are trained to combat crimes at land and sea. Asked of the difference in roles between the NMN and the Navy, Agaba evaded the question but stressed the NMN's security roles.

== Unlicensed academies ==
In June 2009 two men were arrested by the Navy and handed over to police for running an illegal Merchant Navy Academy on a merchant vessel, MT James, in Lagos. The operators of the Lagos Aviation and Maritime Business School (LAMBS) were offering training to a group of young men on how to navigate a vessel, as well as military training, so they could qualify as Merchant Navy personnel. Some of the students had started to wear Merchant Navy uniforms while on shore. According to a naval spokesman only the Nigerian Maritime Academy at Oron, Akwa Ibom, and the Institute of Oceanography and Marine Research on Victoria Island, Lagos were licensed to train merchant navy personnel.

Another Merchant Navy Maritime Academy was established in 2008 in Iperu in Ogun State. It was registered with the Corporate Affairs Commission as a private commercial venture under the Company and Allied Matters Acts (CAMA). For effective practical training for cadets of the institution another company was registered with Corporate Affairs Commission to absorb most of the cadets, the Merchants Navy Shipping Line Limited. In an April 2010 interview Captain Bola Nuga, Commandant of the Merchant Navy Academy, said there was an acute shortage of marine engineers and nautical engineers. The Maritime Academy in Oron and the College of Science in Victoria Island, Lagos were unable to meet the demand for qualified merchant navy staff, and the universities were not offering the courses needed. The academy was founded to help fill the gap, of vital importance to the economy.

In December 2010 the Commandant-General of the NMN, Commodore Aderemi Latinwo, said the academy was moving from Iperu to Iwopin in the Ogun Waterside Local Government Area of Ogun State. The academy head, Bola Nuga, praised the ruler of Iwopin, Oba Julius Adekoya and former President Olusegun Obasanjo for helping the academy to acquire the defunct Iwopin Paper Mill as its new operational base. In January 2011 Aderemi Latinwo and three other senior officers of the NMN were arrested by the police, who alleging that they were running a fake maritime academy. Rear Admiral Emmanuel Ogbor accused Latinwo of presenting himself as a Commodore. He stated that Latinwo had never been in the Nigerian Navy. He also said the school was not registered with the Corporate Affairs Commission or approved by the Ministry of Transport, so had no legal right to operate.

Sunday Adelani, the NMN Director of Communication, described the arrests as a calculated attempt to sabotage the academy and the maritime industry in Nigeria. He stated that the Merchant Navy Maritime Academy was a legal and duly registered institute, recognized by the National Assembly. Adelani said the Minister for Interior, Captain Emmanuel Ihenacho "is a captain from Nigerian Merchant Navy formation, and he was the class mate of Commodore Olatinwo in the academy. So it is wrong to say Nigerian Merchant Navy is fake". Adelani said "For anybody or group of persons to tarnish the image of a noble institution like the Merchant Navy, especially in view of its strategic importance to the Nations economy is callous and wicked". He said the Nigerian Navy should cease its persecution of the Nigerian Merchant Navy and instead view it as a sister organization with complementary goals.
