= Dakuku Peterside =

Turnaround expert / Politician

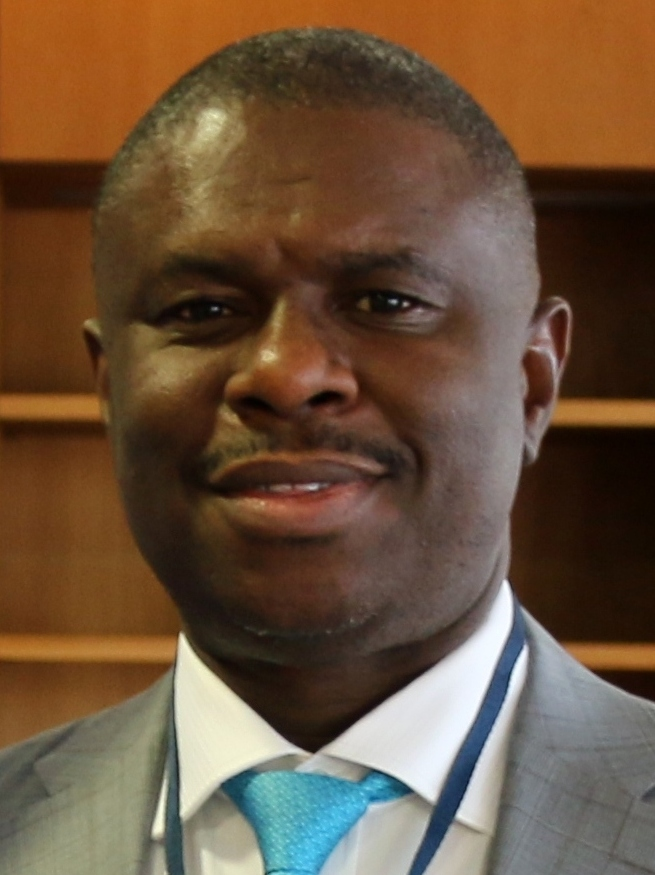

Director General of the Nigerian Maritime Administration and Safety Agency
- In office 10 March 2016 – 4 March 2020
- Preceded by: Zaikede Patrick Akpobolokemi
- Succeeded by: Bashir Y Jamoh

Member of the House of Representatives of Nigeria
- In office 2011–2015
- Constituency: Andoni–Opobo–Nkoro

Rivers State Commissioner of Works
- In office 2007–2011
- Governor: Rotimi Amaechi
- Preceded by: Julius Orumbo
- Succeeded by: Victor Giadom

Executive Director of Development and Leadership Institute (DLI)
- In office 2005–2007

Senior Special Assistant to Governor of Rivers State on Works
- In office 2003–2005

Chairman Opobo-Nkoro Local Government Area
- In office 2002–2003
- Governor: Peter Odili

Personal details
- Born: Biriye, Opobo Kingdom, Rivers State, Nigeria
- Party: All Progressive Congress (APC)
- Spouse: Elima Dakuku
- Children: Soba, Belema and Tamuno
- Education: Rivers State University; University of Port Harcourt
- Occupation: Politician

Dakuku Adol Peterside is a Nigerian politician. He was formerly the Director General of the Nigerian Maritime Administration and Safety Agency from March 2016 to March 2020. Prior to his role at NIMASA, he was a member of the Nigerian House of Representatives.

== Early life and education ==
Peterside was born in Biriye, Kingdom of Opobo, and grew up in Azumini, Aba in present-day Abia State, and in Kaduna and Port Harcourt at various times.

Having graduated from Okrika Grammar School in 1986/87, he went to Rivers State University of Science and Technology (RSUST) in Port Harcourt, where he studied medical laboratory science, specializing in haematology and blood transfusion. He was elected National President, of the National Union of Rivers State Students in January 1992. He was also editor of the student paper Kampuswatch. Peterside returned to RSUST and earned a master's degree in Management. He got his doctoral degree from the University of Port Harcourt.

Peterside is a member of the Nigerian Institute of Management, a fellow of the Institute of Management Consultants of Nigeria, and a member of the Institute of Medical Laboratory Sciences of Nigeria.

== Political career ==
When he graduated from RSUST, he joined public service. He was first appointed Special Assistant to Governor of Rivers State Peter Odili on Student and Youth Affairs in August 1999 at the age of 29.

Peterside was elected to the House of Representatives in 2011, and served between May 2011 and May 2015 as chairman, House Committee on Petroleum Resources (Downstream) where he had the privilege to oversight strategic National Oil and Gas establishments such as the Petroleum Equalisation Fund, Petroleum Products Pricing Regulatory Agency, Pipelines and Products Marketing Company. He co-over sighted the Petroleum Technology Development Fund. He led other legislators to sponsor and champion the Petroleum Industry Bill as chairman of the technical Committee of the House of Representatives. He presented a total of 36 scholarly papers in five countries on the reform of the oil and gas industry and government institutions in developing countries.

Before serving as commissioner of Works, Peterside had served as Executive Director, Development and Leadership Institute 2003–2007, Senior Special Assistant to Governor of Rivers State on works (2003–2005), chairman, Opobo–Nkoro LGA (2002–2003), Special Assistant to Governor of Rivers State on Youths and Student Affairs (1999–2002). He also served concurrently on the Board of the Centre for Black and African Arts and Culture.

He served as Rivers State Commissioner of Works from October 2007 to January 2011. As Commissioner of Works, he managed the largest construction portfolio ever in the history of the state government's construction, supervising a total of 200 road projects (totaling 1,000 km), 5 flyover bridges, and 10 bridges in four years.

n 2017, under Peterside's leadership, NIMASA and the Ministry of Transportation awarded a controversial $195 million maritime security contract to an Israeli firm, HLSI Security Systems and Technologies. The deal faced significant criticism from the Nigerian House of Representatives, which alleged a breach of internal security and a violation of local content laws. In May 2018, President Muhammadu Buhari ordered the termination of the contract and directed the National Security Adviser and the National Intelligence Agency to investigate how the firm obtained security clearance without an "End-User Certificate."

In February 2020 NIMASA, under the leadership of Peterside, faced probe by the House of Representatives for allegedly failing to audit its account for six years. In March 2020, Nigerian President Muhammadu Buhari replaced Peterside with Bashir Y Jamoh as Director-General of NIMASA.

== Awards and honours ==
- NIMASA awarded as the Public Organisation of the year 2016 Awards by Tell Magazine
- Peterside received the award of excellence in public life as "Student-friendly" by Uniport Students Union Government in 2011
- In 2019, he received the Maritime Living Legend award from Maritime Media Limited for his contributions to Nigeria's maritime sector.

== Personal life ==
Peterside is married to Elima Dakuku Peterside, a lawyer, and has three children, Soba, Belema, and Tamuno.

== See also ==
- List of people from Rivers State
