= Bashir Y Jamoh =

Nigerian government official

Bashir Yusuf Jamoh, Ph.D. OFR.

Former Director General Nigerian Maritime Administration and Safety Agency, Nigeria
- Incumbent
- Assumed office 10, March 2020
- Preceded by: Dakuku Peterside
- Succeeded by: Dayo Mobereola

Personal details
- Born: 2 February 1964 (age 62) Kaduna State, Nigeria
- Spouse: Hajiya Zulaihat Bashir
- Education: Baze University, Abuja,- (Bachelor Degree in Law) Bayero University, Kano- (PGD); Korea Maritime and Ocean University,-(MSc); University of Port Harcourt, River's,-PHD
- Occupation: Accountant, Maritime And Logistics Expert

Bashir Yusuf Jamoh OFR, (born on 2 February 1964) is a Nigerian technocrat known for his extensive experience spanning over 37 years in the transportation and maritime sectors of Nigeria's economy. He began his career in the Kaduna State Government before transferring to the Nigerian Maritime Administration and Safety Agency (NIMASA) in 1994. Jamoh previously served as the Executive Director of Finance and Administration at NIMASA. He is also the author of the book Harnessing Nigeria's Maritime Assets: Past, Present, and Future. He is the past President of the Chartered Institute of Transport Administration of Nigeria.

== Background ==
Bashir Yusuf Jamoh holds a bachelor's degree in Law from Baze University, Abuja. He also holds a postgraduate diploma in Management Sciences from Bayero University, Kano, and a master's degree in Management from Korea Maritime and Ocean University. Additionally, he has earned a Ph.D. in Logistics and Transport Management from the University of Port Harcourt. He also attend Ahmadu Bello University where he hold a Diploma in Accounting and Kaduna Teachers College where received Great two Certificate. Jamoh has attended various leadership and management courses at institutions including Harvard University (USA), Oxford University (UK), Cambridge University (UK), International Training Centre of ILO in Turin (Italy), Institute of Public-Private Partnership in Washington, D.C. (USA), International Law Institute (USA), Institute for Leadership and Development for the Public Good (USA), Royal Institute of Public Administration (UK), and World Maritime University Sweden.

== Early career ==
Bashir Yusuf Jamoh began his career in the Kaduna State Government in May 1987 as an Accountant at Produce Purchase, Farmers Supply Company Ltd. He held various roles including Assistant Produce Purchase Manager (1989-1991) and Principal Procurement Officer at Farmers Supply Ltd, Kaduna (1991-1993). He transferred his service to the Nigerian Maritime Administration and Safety Agency (NIMASA) where he advanced through several positions, eventually attaining the rank of Director General. Jamoh's career progression at NIMASA included roles such as Principal Commercial Officer (Operations), Port Services Controller (Onne and Tin-Can Island ports), Assistant Chief Commercial Officer (HQ), Chief Admin Officer (Training), Assistant Director of Wet and Dry Cargo (Operations), Assistant Director (Research), Head of Protocol and Logistics, and Assistant Director (Training).

Bashir Yusuf Jamoh is a member of several professional bodies including the Chartered Institute of Transport and Logistics, Chartered Institute of Administration of Nigeria, Institute of Maritime Economists Canada, Institute of Logistics London, Nigeria Institute of International Affairs, National Speakers Association (NSA), and Global Speakers Federation USA, Member Sub-committee of Analysis of Consolidated Imo Audit summary reports issued under the voluntary phase of the scheme 2016, Member Committee on implementation Modalities of a study reports on Performance Based Reward Framework for NIMASA 2016, Member committee on Development of job Description for NIMASA, Member 4 point Agenda Philosophy and vision of NIMASA Executive management, Co-chairman Organizing committee on National Training on Marine Biological Baseline Studies for the Implementation of Ballast Water Management Convention 2004 In Nigeria, Coordinator, NIMASA Interface with the Automated for Customs Data ASYC Platform to check out the incidences of Non - Declaration under declaration of cargoes.

== Major achievement in NIMASA ==
Bashir Yusuf Jamoh tenure as NIMASA Director General has brought several advancements to the agency, marking him as the first internal leader in its history. His expertise in the maritime sector has led to significant achievements including:

1. Spearheading the implementation of Nigeria's Deep Blue Project, known as the National Integrated National Security and Waterways Protection Infrastructure, resulting in a notable reduction in piracy in Nigerian waters and the Gulf of Guinea.
2. Facilitating the creation of a new framework for addressing maritime insecurity in the Gulf of Guinea through GOG-MCF/SHADE GOG, involving collaboration between Nigeria (Nigerian Navy and NIMASA) and the Inter-Regional Coordinating Centre in Yaoundé.
3. Supporting the development of the Maritime Industry's Environmental Sensitivity Mapping Index (ESI).
4. Enhancing NIMASA's role as the primary agency for promoting the Blue Economy Agenda.
5. Establishing the Littoral States Cooperation (LISCON), which brought together governors of littoral states to sign a memorandum of understanding, fostering collaboration for Blue Growth in Nigeria.
6. Creating the NIMASA Maritime Stakeholders Engagement Contact Centre to improve interaction with stakeholders.
7. He Led the Restructuring, Reformation and Repositioning of the Agency (NIMASA).
8. He managed the improvement of Revenue Generation and Steady Remittance to the Consolidated Revenue Fund (CFR) of the Federal Government.
9. He was the Chairman of the organizing committee of the successfully hosted 3rd Association of African Maritime Administration (AAMA) in 2017.
10. He trained over 1,650 various personnel Locally and Internationally in diverse subjects skills.
11. Established equipped and managed NIMASA's Ultra-modern training centre with capacity to accommodate 200 participants at a time.
12. Successfully planned managed and appraised capacity development of the largest Maritime organization for about a decade.
13. Improve and Engaged the Agency training to world class standard.
14. Budgetary Management of over 117 billion Naira with commensurate value for every Naira spent.
15. Accidents and Incidents free management of Agency protocol and logistics portfolio for local and international operations.
16. Efficient research and Data management for Actionable Maritime planning and administration in collaboration with Vessel/Cargo related MDAs.
17. Effective Co-ordination of revenue generations from operations with a monthly budget of up to $40 million.
18. Effectively managed the operations of incoming and outgoing vessels in major ports across coastal Nigeria.
19. In Kaduna State, sound planning, procurement and management of Agricultural supplies with increased profit for farming enterprise and its value chain.

== Philanthropy ==
Bashir Yusuf Jamoh commitment to public service led to the establishment of the Dr. Bashir Yusuf Jamoh Foundation, which has operated for over a decade. The foundation has made significant contributions across Nigeria, focusing on areas such as education through sponsorship of indigent students, medical outreaches benefiting thousands of people, social services, and skills acquisition initiatives.

== Publications ==
- Harnessing Nigeria's maritime Assets-past, present and future 2018.
- Securing Nigeria's water;port paradox and potentials.2020
- Maritime mandate.
- Managing With diversity and Inclusion in Mind.
- Influence of Cabotage Act, 2023 on Nigerian Maritime Administration and Safety Agency Coastline Operation.
- Unlocking the Potential of Transportation for Sustainable Development in Nigeria.
- Assessment of the Cabotage Act in Nigeria (2007-2018).
- Influence of Leadership Styles on Organisation Efficiency in the Public and Private Sector in Nigeria.
- Leadership by Excellence.
- Recent Trends in the Temporal Pattern of Maritime Security Incidents in Nigeria.
- Cost of Piracy.

== Awards and recognition ==
1. Officer of the Order of the Federal Republic (OFR).
2. Zik Award.
3. Top 10 magazine excellence Awards 2021.
4. National productivity merit Award.

== Traditional Title ==
- BAATONA Of Akure Kingdom.
- Ciroman Kasar Hausa.
