= Emmanuel Iheanacho =

Federal Minister of Interior
- In office 6 April 2010 – July 2011
- Preceded by: Shettima Mustapha
- Succeeded by: Patrick Abba Moro

Personal details
- Born: Imo State, Nigeria

Emmanuel Iheanacho is a retired Merchant Navy Captain who was appointed Nigerian Minister of Interior on 6 April 2010, when Acting President Goodluck Jonathan announced his new cabinet. He was replaced by Patrick Abba Moro in the cabinet announced in July 2011.

== Early career ==
Iheanacho was born in Imo State. He attended the University of Wales, Cardiff, United Kingdom where he obtained a Master of Science degree in International Transport, and also earned a Master of Business Administration (MBA) degree in General Management from the University of Bradford. He joined the navy, retiring with the rank of captain.

== Business career ==
Iheanacho's latest position as Chairman of Poseidon Commodities Trading Ltd. in London ended in legal disputes with employees and was handled by the Employment tribunal in London. Iheanacho became Managing Director of Genesis Worldwide Shipping Company, and Chairman/CEO of Integrated Oil and Gas. As Executive Secretary of the Nigerian Shipping Companies Association, in July 2004 he praised the cabotage law that had been passed a few years earlier but called for a more consistent policy and greater financial support from the government to build up the Nigerian shipping industry, including creation of a national carrier. As Vice President of the Indigenous Ship Owners Association of Nigeria, in August 2007 he praised the Nigerian Maritime Administration and Safety Agency, and called for stability in its leadership.

Iheanacho gained international visibility at the United Nations Conference on Trade and Development where he was an external consultant on global shipping and marine transportation. Speaking in February 2010 about a report from the International Maritime Bureau which ranked Nigeria second only to Somalia in terms of piracy risk, he called for a stronger naval presence in coastal waters. In March 2010 he called for deregulation of the downstream sector of the oil and gas industry, and criticized the N700 billion annual subsidies to this sector which he said were appropriated before providing any benefit to the people.

== Political career ==
Iheanacho was nominated for a ministerial position in November 2008, despite criticism that he is from the same town as Kema Chikwe, Nigeria's ambassador to Ireland, and Chuka Odum, then Minister of State for Environment, Housing and Urban Development. Later his nomination was dropped. He was again nominated for a ministerial position in March 2010, and was said to be the choice of the National Chairman of the People's Democratic Party (PDP), Prince Vincent Ogbulafor.

Shortly after being appointed Minister of Interior, Iheanacho toured the Medium Security Prison in Kuje, Abuja, where he found many unfinished projects and demanded action. He also said his ministry would work with the ministry of justice to speed up the trials of over 30,000 prison inmates still waiting trial, and to allow for release of inmates who had not been tried after three or more years in jail. In April 2010 he inaugurated the Nigeria Civil Defence College for Peace Disaster Management, Katsina, an institution for training security personnel.

On 18 April 2011, the Jonathan administration suspended Iheanacho from his post as Minister of Interior one day after Jonathan had been reelected. The reason was said to be "a number of lapses in the political leadership of the ministry traceable to his personal and official conduct". The decision to suspend rather than dismiss the minister was unusual but was not immediately explained.
