= Louis Odumegwu Ojukwu =

Nigerian businessman (1909–1966)

Chief Louis Ojukwu OBE
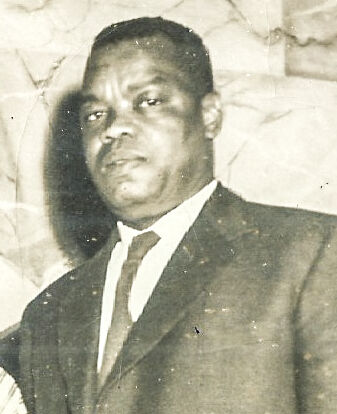
- Ojukwu in 1954
- Born: 7 July 1909; Nnewi
- Died: 13 September 1966 (aged 64)
- Education: Hope Waddell Training Institute
- Occupation: Business tycoon
- Children: Emeka Odumegwu Ojukwu

Sir Louis Phillip Odumegwu Ojukwu, OBE Listen 7 July 1909– 13 September 1966) was a Nigerian business tycoon from the Ojukwu family of Nnewi.

Ojukwu was the founder of Ojukwu Transport, Ojukwu Stores and Ojukwu Textiles. At the peak of his success, he was the first and founding president of The Nigerian Stock Exchange, as well as president of The African Continental Bank. He also served on the board of directors of some of Nigeria's most profitable companies, such as Shell Nigeria, Guinness Nigeria Limited, Nigerian National Shipping Line, Nigerian Cement Factory, Nigerian Coal Corporation, Costain West Africa Ltd, John Holt plc, Nigerian Marketing Board amongst others. He won a parliamentary seat during the nation's first republic.

He attended a primary school in Asaba and the Hope Waddell Training Institute. His son Chukwuemeka Odumegwu Ojukwu was a Nigerian military governor and the president of the secessionist state of Biafra.

== Life and career ==
Ojukwu started his professional career at the Agricultural department before leaving to join John Holt as a sales clerk. He also incorporated a textile company in Onitsha to supplement his income during this period. At John Holt, he noticed the severe strain a lack of adequate transportation had on Eastern textile traders. He left to create his own transport company to improve the trading environment for Nigerian traders.

His success was also oiled by the economic boom after World War II, working with the West African Railway Company and the newly inaugurated produce boards, he provided his fleet for commodity transportation and for other traders use. As a transporter he had his own transport company (Ojukwu Transport Limited) which was the first major transport company to move the easterners to Lagos from the Asaba end of the Niger river after they might have crossed over from Onitsha on a boat.

During the 1950s, he diversified his interest, bought some industries, invested heavily in the real estate sector and became a director in numerous major corporations including the state-owned Nigerian National Shipping Line. He was a member of the board of Nigerian Coal Corporation, Shell Oil, D'Archy, and the African Continental Bank.

In 1958, he was chairman of the Eastern Region Development Corporation and the Eastern Regional Marketing Board.

On 1 May 1, 1953, he was appointed head of an NCNC peace committee and given power to choose most of the committee's members. The committee was charged with the responsibility of restoring peace in the regional House of Assembly. His views on policy were a little bit capitalistic and right of Zik's socialist undertones.

He was a co-author of a report on the Economic Mission to Europe and North America with Azikiwe, the report recommended the investment of extra funds from the produce marketing board in a regional bank and public corporations to stimulate economic development.

Throughout the era of the World War and after, the Ojukwu trucks carried goods and raked in income for their owner. At a point, the British had their supplies for the war moved by Louis's trucks - a service for which Louis was later rewarded; years later, he was knighted by Queen Elizabeth II.

As his wealth grew, his influence and clout began to extend beyond the industry. He was active in pre-independence politics and was a donor of the National Council of Nigeria and the Cameroons), a political party which had Nnamdi Azikiwe as one of its members. At a point, he was elected to the House of Representatives.

== Death ==
Ojukwu died in 1966, just a year before the Nigerian Civil War. His son, Chukwuemeka Odumegwu Ojukwu, would later become the leader of the secessionist state of Biafra.

== Sources ==
- Forrest, Tom (2022). The Advance of African Capital: The Growth of Nigerian Private Enterprise. Edinburgh University Press. doi:10.1515/9781474496889. ISBN 9781474496889. OCLC 1302165953.
- Forsyth, Frederick (1992). Emeka. Spectrum Books. p. 1. ISBN 9789782462091.
- Sklar, Robert L. (1963). Nigerian Political Parties: Power in an Emergent African Nation. Princeton University Press. ISBN 9781400878239. OCLC 927404565.
