= Nigerian Coal Corporation =

Government parastatal corporation responsible for exporting coal

The Nigerian Coal Corporation (NCC) is a Nigerian parastatal corporation responsible for mining and selling coal. It is based in Enugu.

== Origin ==
In the 1909, coal was discovered in Enugu, Nigeria. The Ogbete drift mine opened six years later. The Ogbete mine's operations and others in the country were merged into a new corporation in 1950: The Nigerian Coal Corporation. The NCC was tasked with exploiting coal resources, and held a monopoly on coal and coke mining, production, and sales until 1999.

== Production problems and decline of coal ==
Nigeria's coal industry suffered a blow in the 1950s when oil was discovered. Up until this point, the Nigerian Railway Corporation was the largest consumer of coal in the country. However, after the discovery of oil, the Railway Corporation began to replace its coal-burning trains with diesel-powered engines. An additional negative impact came when the Electricity Corporation of Nigeria began converting its power generation equipment from coal to diesel and gas as well.

The Nigerian Civil War also negatively impacted coal production; many mines were abandoned during the war. Following the war, production never completely recovered and coal production levels were erratic. Attempts at mechanizing production ended badly, as both the implementation and maintenance of imported mining equipment proved troublesome, and hurt production. After the civil war, the Nigerian coal industry could not return to its peak production in the 1950s.

PRODUCTION LEVELS
Year	Tons Produced
1916	25,511
1920	180,122
1930	347,125
1940	318,594
1950	583,435
1960	665,681
1970	24,404
1980	118,317
1987	117,155

Nigeria still holds large coal reserves, estimated to be at least 2 billion metric tons. The discovery of bituminous coal suitable for use in coke production for the iron and steel industries opens up potential new domestic markets. With the loss of its largest domestic consumers, the NCC began exporting coal to Italy and the United Kingdom, as its low sulphur content is desirable.

In 1999, the NCC lost its monopoly over the Nigerian coal industry as the Obasanjo government allowed private companies to begin operating coal fields in joint ventures with the NCC, with an eventual goal of completely selling off the NCC's assets to private investors. The Nigerian government planned to sell 40% to private investors and 20% to the Nigerian public, while retaining 40%.

In 2002, work stopped at NCC-operated mines. In 2003, the Nigerian government announced plans to create a technical advisory committee that would be tasked with reviving Nigeria's coal industry.

By 2004, the technical committee had still not issued their report, and the NCC found itself almost bankrupt. To raise funds, it began to sell off some of its assets in an attempt to pay off its mounting debt, including salary that was owed to its employees. Additionally, the Enugu State Government protested the planned NCC privatisation and demanded the ability to consult with the Federal Government on any planned sale.

While references are made in the news media to a possible sale of the NCC, the Nigerian Bureau of Public Enterprises, the government body tasked with selling public corporations, still lists the NCC as an asset for sale on their website as of April 2008, and no news reports to date provide any information about the supposed sale.

== Mine ==
Historic coalfields that no longer produce coal are in italics, functional mines are in bold.

- Amansiodo Coal Field, Enugu State
- Ezinmo Coal Field, Enugu State
- Inyi Coal Field, Enugu State
- Obwetti Mine

Obwetti was closed down due to low production in the late 1950s.

- Ogbete Mine, Enugu State

This mine opened in 1915, but was closed and flooded during the Civil War. It reopened in 1972, and became the country's largest coal mining operation until its closure.

- Ogboyoga I Coal Field, Kogi State
- Ogboyoga II Coal Field, Kogi State
- Ogwashi-Azagba Lignite Field, Delta State
- **Okaba Coal Field**, Kogi State
- **Okpara Mine**, Anambra State
- **Onyeama Mine**, Enugu State
- Oyeama Mine, Anambra State
- **Owupka Mine**, Benue State
- Ribadu Mine
- '**Maiganga Mine'**, Gombe State

This mine opened in the late 1950s and held enough coal to produce five hundred tons a day for seven years. Sources:
