= National Monuments Council =

National Monuments Council may refer to:

- National Monuments Council (Chile)
- National Monuments Council (South Africa and Namibia)
