= Nigerian Maritime Administration and Safety Agency =

Government agency in Nigeria

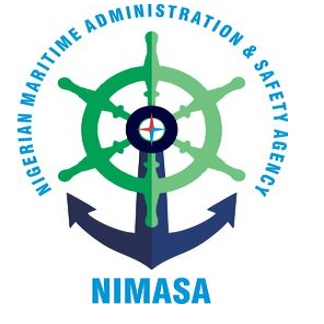
- Abbreviation: NIMASA
- Formation: 1 August 2006
- Purpose: Regulate the maritime industry of Nigeria
- Headquarters: NIMASA Towers, #35 Adetokunbo Ademola Street, Victoria Island, Lagos 106104, Lagos
- Official language: English
- Director General: Dayo Mobereola
- Website: http://nimasa.gov.ng/

The Nigerian Maritime Administration and Safety Agency (NIMASA), formerly the National Maritime Authority (NMA) is a Nigerian government agency responsible for regulations related to Nigerian shipping, maritime and coastal waters. The agency also undertakes inspections and provides search and rescue services. The governing board is made up of representatives of the Ministry of Labour, the Ministry of Transport and those of the Navy.

NIMASA had done maritime accident investigations.

== National Maritime Authority ==
The National Maritime Authority (NMA), predecessor of NIMASA, was established by the Shipping Policy Decree of 11 May 1987, and was supervised by the Federal Ministry of Transport. Its mandate was to ensure orderly development, protection and manpower training in the shipping industry. The NMA also was given responsibility for monitoring marine pollution and spillage in Nigerian waters. The oil platforms off the Niger Delta are vulnerable, and the decree recognized the role of maritime cargo carriage in defense.

=== Cargo allocation ===
The decree establishing the NMA applied the 40-40-20 principal defined by the United Nations Conference on Trade and Development (UNCTAD). This meant that 40% of cargo should be allocated to ships from the importer, 40% to ships from the exporter and 20% subject to open competition, which may include ships from other countries. For non-conference and bulk cargoes it went further, sharing on a 50-50 basis, with the NMA having authority to allocate all export cargoes. Despite this provision, in practice the oil extraction companies supplied their own tankers to transport most of the crude to their refineries abroad. However, members of the American-West African Shipping Conference said they had been arbitrarily denied shipments by the NMA, an issue raised several times by the United States government. In 1988, the NMA announced that it would be setting up freight booking offices in Liverpool, London, Hamburg, Paris, Tokyo, New York and Brazil. Dr. Bassey U. Ekong, Director General of the NMA, said the centers would record all inbound Nigerian cargos and would ensure "full implementations of UNCTAD's 40-40-20 principle". In the end, none of the offices opened.

=== Foreign shippers ===
In 1988 the NMA granted six Nigerian shipping lines "national carrier" status, including the state-owned Nigerian National Shipping Line. The NMA had plans to extend this status to more domestic companies so as to reduce control of trade by foreign-owned lines. For reasons of national pride, the NMA did not encourage domestic shipping lines to engage in feeder services, bringing goods to a distribution point for direct onward shipping, preferring direct-line services. An NMA official said in 1989 "the development of feeder services is not at the moment consonant with the region's maritime development". According to UNCTAD, the lines would have been best suited to feeder services, and ignoring this approach may have led to their demise.

Dependence on foreign shippers, who were carrying over 80% of cargo by 1992, made the country vulnerable. When the NMA attempted to impose a dock charge of $0.25 per tonne of crude oil loaded in Nigerian ports and oil terminals, the shipping companies threatened to go elsewhere, saying the charge would make Nigerian oil uncompetitive. The NMA had no choice but to suspend the fee. The NMA charges on shipping lines that called into Nigerian ports were increased in 2003, with a surcharge being added to taxes on all Nigerian freights. In December 2004, based on recommendations from the World Bank, the government announced that all NMA charges would be scrapped as of January 2005. There were delays in implementing the change.

=== Corruption ===
During the period between 1987 and 1992 the NMA staff included some professionals, mainly transport economists. However, most employees had no experience in the shipping industry but were hired due to their connections. As a result, the NMA was ineffective at best. At a 1991 seminar the NMA was said to be inefficient and corrupt. One particularly harsh characterization was that the NMA was "a dead dog, but a dangerous one, because it sucks blood by collecting money in hard currency for services not rendered". In the 1980s and 1990s the National Maritime Authority administered the Ship Acquisition and Ship Building Fund, giving loans that were intended to encourage ownership of ships by Nigerians. Some loans were used for that purpose, while much of the money was diverted to other uses by politicians, friends of the military junta and "briefcase ship owners". The fund was suspended in the late 1990s, but most of the money was never recovered.

In 2003, Nigeria provided just $25 million for shipping development, a very small amount given the size of the country. Writing in 2004, Ayodeji Olukoju said "In effect, both the indigenous entrepreneurs and the National Maritime Authority merely play the role of rent collectors. The latter's earnings (in hard currency) rather than serve in any meaningful way to develop the industry have simply made it a veritable honey-pot plundered by successive governments and their agents".

In 2020, The Economic and Financial Crimes Commission (EFCC) prosecuted Amosu, alongside Air Vice Marshall Jacobs Adigun, a former NAF Chief of Accounts and Budget, and Air Commodore Owodunni Olugbenga, a former NAF Director of Finance and Budget, for their alleged roles in the diversion to personal use of about N21billion belonging to the NAF. They are facing an amended 13-count charge to which they have pleaded "not guilty".

== NIMASA activities ==
NIMASA was created on 1 August 2006 when the National Maritime Authority was merged with the Joint Maritime Labour Industrial Council. Both were formerly parastatals of the Federal Ministry of Transport. Under the act establishing NIMASA, 5% of annual income would support the Maritime Academy of Nigeria (MAN) and 35% of income would be used to develop maritime infrastructure. The agency provided funding to MAN for a jetty and boat project. In December 2009 the agency said it was setting up a fund which would cover 40% of the cost of a nautical education, with the student being responsible for the remainder.

In June 2010 it was confirmed that NIMASA was encouraging Nigerians to enter the maritime industry. The agency was enforcing the directive that all ship operators engaged in the cabotage trade, whether Nigerian or foreign-owned, must have Nigerian cadets on board so they could gain sea-time experience. However, there was still a severe shortage of trained sailors. As of 2011 the agency was still spending large amounts on training Nigerians in India, Glasgow and Egypt because MAN lacked the capability to provide complete training. A government plan to open new training institutes was under criticism, since they seemed likely to be operated no more effectively than MAN.

In May 2011 NIMASA was mediating between the Seaport Terminal Operators Association of Nigeria and the Maritime Workers Union of Nigeria, who were seeking improved wages and terms of service. NIMASA was involved in the debate over a proposal to create a Maritime Security Agency (MASECA) as a successor to the Presidential Implementation Committee on Maritime Safety and Security (PICOMSS). The objective was to provide greater protection for merchant vessels against rising levels of piracy. However, NIMASA and the United Nations were concerned that MASECA could be in conflict with the International Convention for the Safety of Life at Sea, which does not allow merchant ships to be armed. The MASECA act also seemed to be in conflict with the act establishing NIMASA.

In June 2011 the agency promoted over 60% of its staff, including 135 junior staff who were promoted to the next grade levels, and 536 senior staff. Also in June 2011, it was announced that NIMASA would be acting as the approving authority and guarantor for beneficiaries of a new Cabotage Vessels Finance Fund, this time administered by banks, replacing the former Ship Acquisition and Ship Building Fund.

On 28 November 2020, NIMASA commissioned its first-ever e-library to bridge the Knowledge Gap in the industry.

== Deep Blue Project ==
The Deep Blue Project, officially the Integrated National Security and Waterways Protection Infrastructure, is a Nigerian Maritime Administration and Safety Agency (NIMASA) initiative launched in 2019 to enhance maritime security in Nigeria's territorial waters and the Gulf of Guinea. Aimed at combating piracy, illegal fishing, and other maritime crimes, the project deploys advanced assets managed primarily by the Nigerian Navy, including patrol boats, interceptor boats, maritime surveillance aircraft, helicopters, drones, armored vehicles, and a Command, Control, Communication, Computers, and Intelligence (C4i) system integrated with the Navy's Falcon Eye system. Coastal radar stations, sensor networks, Automatic Identification System (AIS), and Long Range Identification Tracking (LRIT) further support real-time monitoring. The project has significantly reduced piracy, achieving zero piracy reports in recent years, and supports Nigeria's blue economy by fostering a safer maritime environment for trade and investment. It operates under a Memorandum of Understanding (MoU) between NIMASA and the Navy, with NIMASA funding assets and the Navy handling operations. Challenges include high maintenance costs and jurisdictional overlaps. The International Maritime Organization (IMO) has recognized its success in curbing piracy.

=== Equipment ===
Name	Image	Type	Vessels	Origin	Notes
Patrol Boats
Patrol Boat		Patrol Boat	DB Lagos DB Abuja	Netherlands	Built by Shipyard De Hoop, they are multi-purpose surveillance vessel and will be deployed in Nigeria to track down criminal activity such as illegal fishing, espionage, terrorism, oil theft, illegal immigration, smuggling and piracy.
Interceptor Boats		DHM1050		Netherlands	Built by De Haas Shipyard, Managed by the navy
Fast Interventions		1800 CPV	9	Spain	Built by Aresa Shipyard, Managed by the Navy
Aircraft
AgustaWestland AW109		Search & Rescue	2	Italy	Managed by the Navy
CJ3		Maritime surveillance	2	Israel	Managed by the Air force
UAV
TEKEVER AR3 UAV		UAV		Portugal	Managed by the Navy
Armoured Vehicle
Proforce Ara		APC		Nigeria	Managed by the Navy
Saymar Musketeer		APC		Israel	Managed by the Navy

== Leadership ==
Dr. Bassey U. Ekong was the Director General in 1988. Director General Alhaji Munir Jafar’ was replaced by Buba Galadima, who was Director General of the NMA from 1996 to 1998. Galadima was said to have diverted funds from the NMA to the transmutation campaign of General Sani Abacha. He was succeeded by John Egesi, a Maritime Economist. Egesi, who had been promoted from within the organization, was dismissed after only three months due to internal intrigues.

Dr George Mbanefo Eneh was appointed Director-General of the National Maritime Authority in 1999. Eneh, a World Bank transport expert, was followed after a year by Architect Ferdinand Agu. Agu served for four years, being reappointed for a second term during the tenure of Abiye Sekibo as Transport Minister. He was dismissed in December 2005. Agu was replaced by Engineer Festus Ugwu, who was followed by Mrs. Mfon Usoro, a Maritime Lawyer. Usoro was succeeded by Dr. Shamsideen Adegboyega Dosunmu, who holds a PhD in Public Administration, and was appointed in May 2007. Dosunmu had been promoted from the job of Executive Director, Finance and Administration of NIMASA. He was followed by Temisan Omatseye, a Maritime Lawyer.

In 2009, President Umaru Musa Yaradua appointed Senator Baba Tela as the Board Chairman of NIMASA.

Late in 2010 the Minister of Transport, Yusuf Sulaiman, conducted an audit into the agency. Charges of misappropriation and corruption were laid against the Director General of the agency, Temisanren Omatseye. On 24 November 2010 the Economic and Financial Crimes Commission arrested Omatseye. Mohammed Kabiru Shehu, Director of Procurement and Jarma Bulama, Director of Finance were suspended from office, but were recalled in June 2011.

As of June 2011 the Chairman of the board was Alhaji Adamu Mu'Azu, and the Director General and Chief Executive Officer was Zaikede Patrick Akpobolokemi. Akpobolokemi had been appointed by President Goodluck Jonathan on 22 December 2010. He was a lecturer at Niger Delta University before being appointed to succeed Omatseye. Akpobolokemi was sacked on July 16, 2015, and later arrested by the Economic and Financial Crime Commission (EFCC).

Dr. Dakuku Adolphus Peterside assumed duty as the Director General/CEO of the Nigerian Maritime Administration and Safety Agency (NIMASA) on Tuesday March 15, 2016. The appointment took effect from 10 March 2016.

On August 26, 2016, the Nigerian President General Muhammadu Buhari appointed General Jonathan India Garba as the Board Chairman for NIMASA.

On March 4, 2020, President Muhammadu Buhari approved the appointment of Bashir Y Jamoh as the Director-General of the Nigerian Maritime Administration and Safety Agency (NIMASA). Bashir Y. Jamoh was the Executive Director Finance and Administration before he succeeded Dakuku Peterside whose tenure as NIMASA DG ended on March 10, 2020.

On 12 March 2024, President Tinubu appointed Dr. Dayo Mobereola, a former commissioner for transportation in Lagos state as the agency's new D.G., on the expiration of the tenure of the outgoing D.G.

== See also ==
- Nigerian Ports Authority

== Sources ==
- Aderibigbe, Dele (25 November 2010). "EFCC arrests NIMASA boss over alleged financial impropriety". Nigerian Tribune. Archived from the original on 21 December 2010.
- AfDevInfo. "National Maritime Authority".
- Andrew Airahuobhor (2011-06-09). "Controversy trails FG plan to establish new maritime training institutions". The Daily Independent (Lagos).
- Amjadi, Azita; Reincke, Ulrich; Yeats, Alexander J. (1996). Did external barriers cause the marginalization of Sub-Saharan Africa in world trade?, Parts 63-348. World Bank Publications. ISBN 0-8213-3826-9.
- Bamgboye, Adelanwa (10 May 2007). "NIMASA Gets New DG, Board". Daily Trust.
- Bassey, Celestine Oyom; Dokubo, Charles Quarker (2011). Defence Policy of Nigeria: Capability and Context. AuthorHouse. ISBN 1-4567-3156-4.
- Clement, Udeme (June 12, 2011). "The imperatives of maritime ministry, devt bank". Vanguard (Nigeria).
- Davis, Stephen (June 11, 2011). "ON WATCH:Maritime Security". Next (Nigeria). Archived from the original on June 14, 2011.
- Ehirim, Chuks (June 27, 2009). "2011: Buhari, Atiku plot against Yar'Adua". Online Nigeria. Archived from the original on April 6, 2012.
- Iheduru, Okechukwu Chris (1996). The political economy of international shipping in developing countries. University of Delaware Press. ISBN 0-87413-552-4.
- John Iwori (3 June 2011). "How IMO Law Stalled New Maritime Security Agency". ThisDay. Archived from the original on 6 June 2011.
- John Iwori (10 June 2011). "FG Recalls Suspended NIMASA Directors". ThisDay. Archived from the original on 13 June 2011.
- Mwalimu, Charles (2005). The Nigerian legal system. Peter Lang. ISBN 0-8204-7126-7.
- "ZIAKEDE PATRICK AKPOBOLOKEMI ASSUMES OFFICE AS DG/CEO NIMASA- ASSURES OF A BETTER MARITIME SECTOR IN 2011". NIMASA News. 2010-12-30. Archived from the original on 2011-08-23.
- NIMASA. "About Us". Archived from the original on 2011-08-23.
- "About". NIMASA. Archived from the original on 2011-08-23.
- Ogbuokiri, Paul (17 June 2010). "UN Seafarers Day - Mariner, Others Decry Shortfall of Seafarers". Daily Champion.
- Ola, Timothy (31 May 2011). "Wage increase: Maritime workers threaten to pull out from ports". The Sun (Nigeria). Archived from the original on 3 June 2011.
- Olukoju, Ayodeji (2004). The "Liverpool" of West Africa: the dynamics and impact of maritime trade in Lagos, 1900-1950. Africa World Press. ISBN 1-59221-292-1.
- P.M. News (June 17, 2011). "FG Disburses Funds To Nigerians".
- USTR: United States Trade Representative (1993). National Trade Estimate Report on Foreign Trade Barriers 1992. DIANE Publishing. ISBN 1-56806-700-3.
- "WSN: NIMASA promotes over 60% staff". World Stage News. 8 June 2011. Archived from the original on 14 March 2012.
- Salau, Sulaimon (5 March 2020). "Buhari appoints Jamoh to replace Peterside as NIMASA DG". The Guardian.
