= Nissan NV =

Series of Nissan commercial vans

The Nissan NV (Nissan Van) is a term used by the Japanese automaker Nissan for a number of their commercial vans:

- Nissan NV100 Clipper - A badge engineered Mitsubishi Minicab/Suzuki Every for the Japanese market
- Nissan NV100 Clipper Rio - A passenger car variant of the NV100 Clipper, badge engineered Suzuki Every Wagon for the Japanese market
- Nissan NV150 AD - A subcompact van and station wagon for the Japanese market
- Nissan NV200 (NV200 Vanette) - A light van and leisure activity vehicle, for Asian, European, and American markets
- Nissan NV250 - A badge engineered Renault Kangoo, for European markets
- Nissan NV300 - A badge engineered Renault Trafic, for European markets
- Nissan NV350 Caravan/NV350 Urvan - A light van or minibus, for Asian markets
- Nissan NV400 - A badge engineered Renault Master, for European markets
- Nissan NV1500/NV2500/NV3500 - A full size van, for the North American market
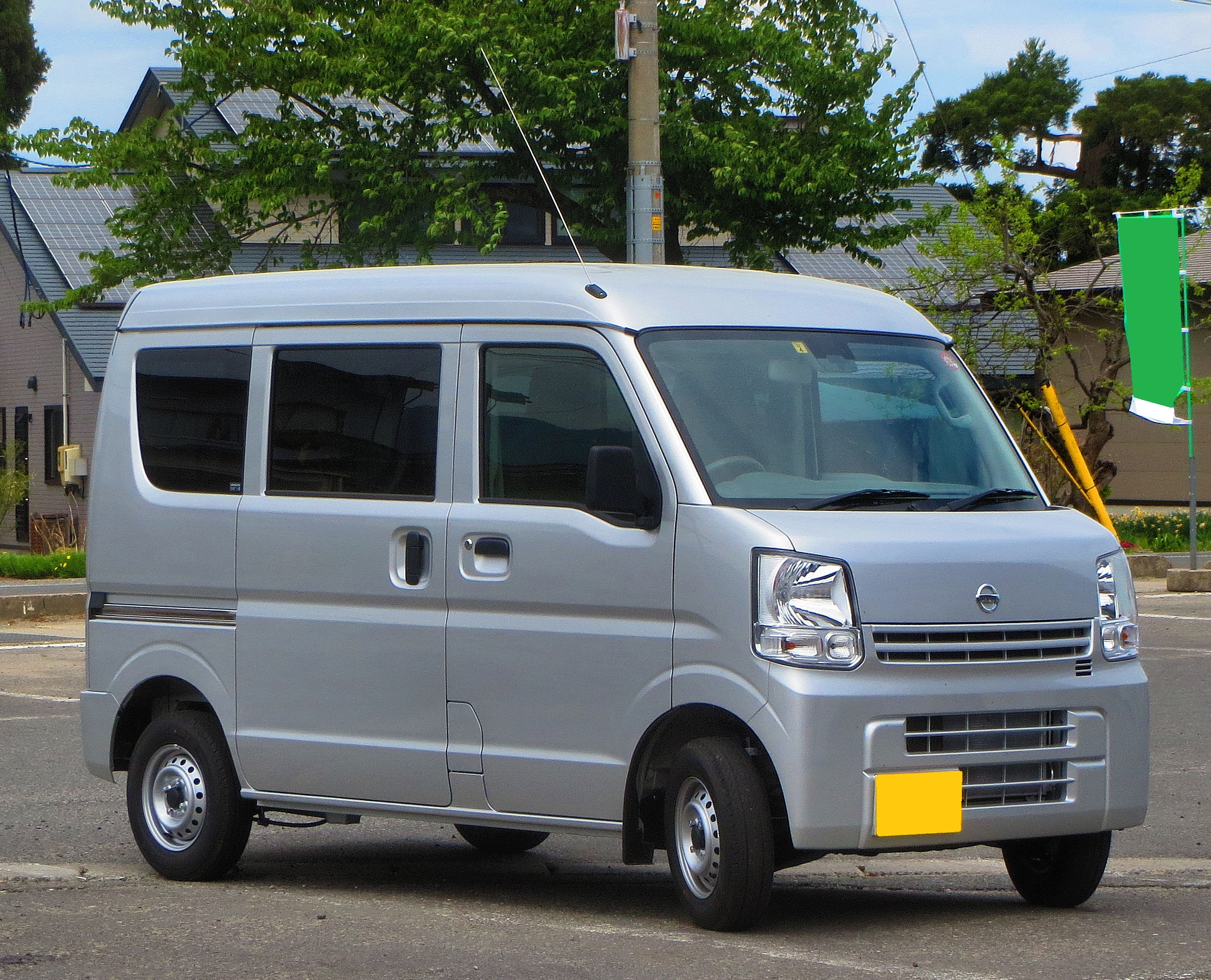
Nissan NV100 Clipper

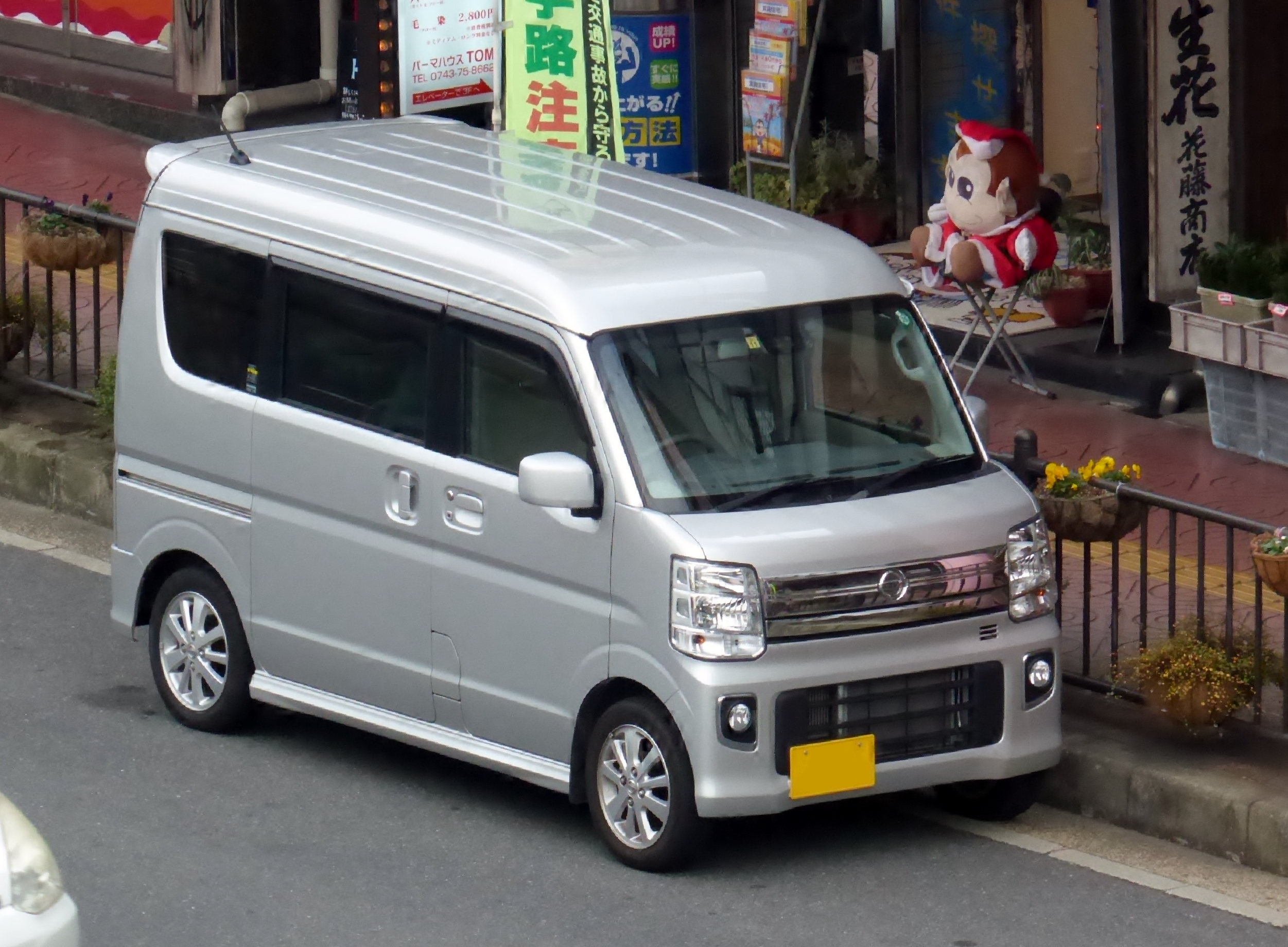
Nissan NV100 Clipper Rio

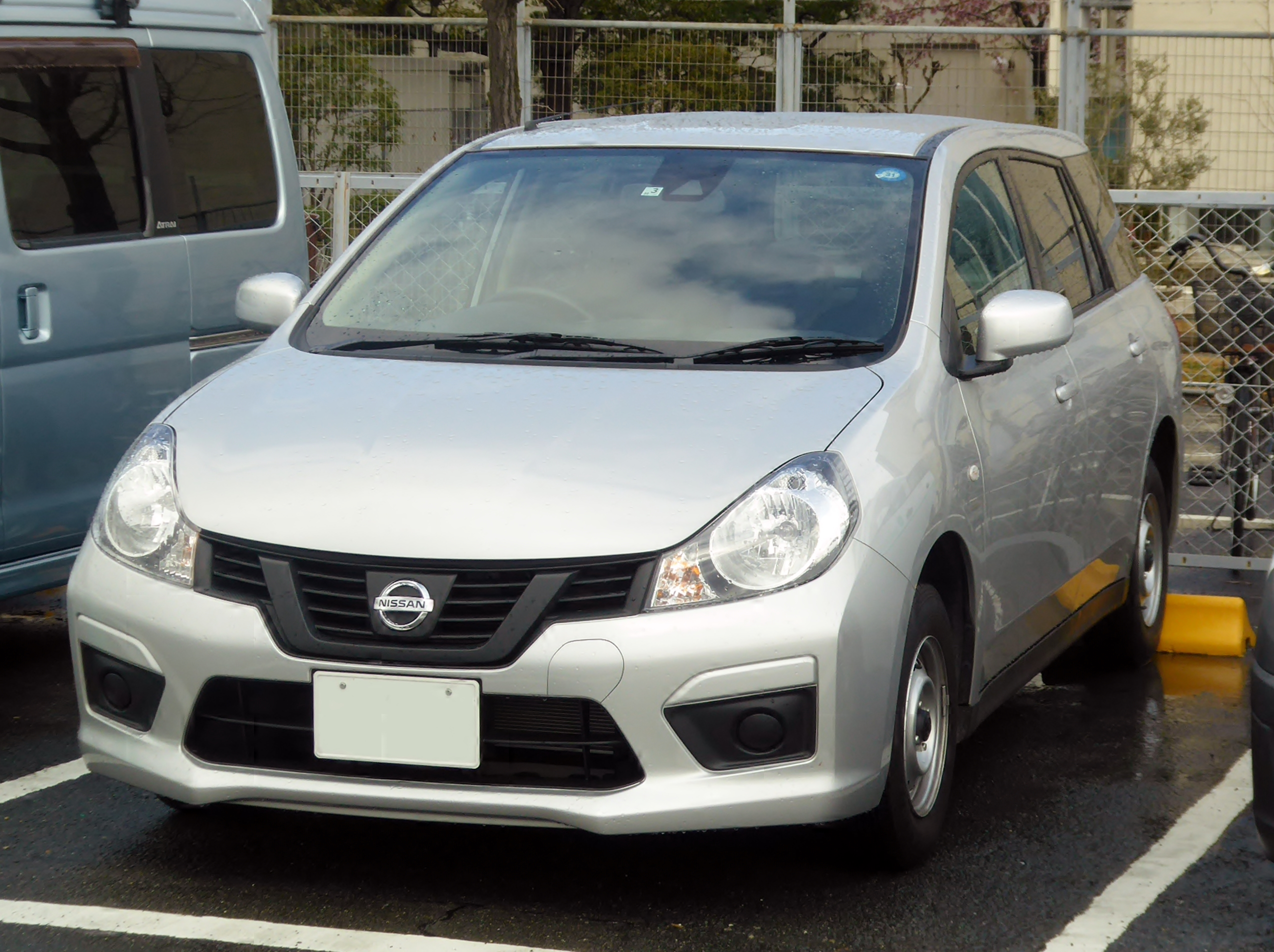
Nissan NV150 AD

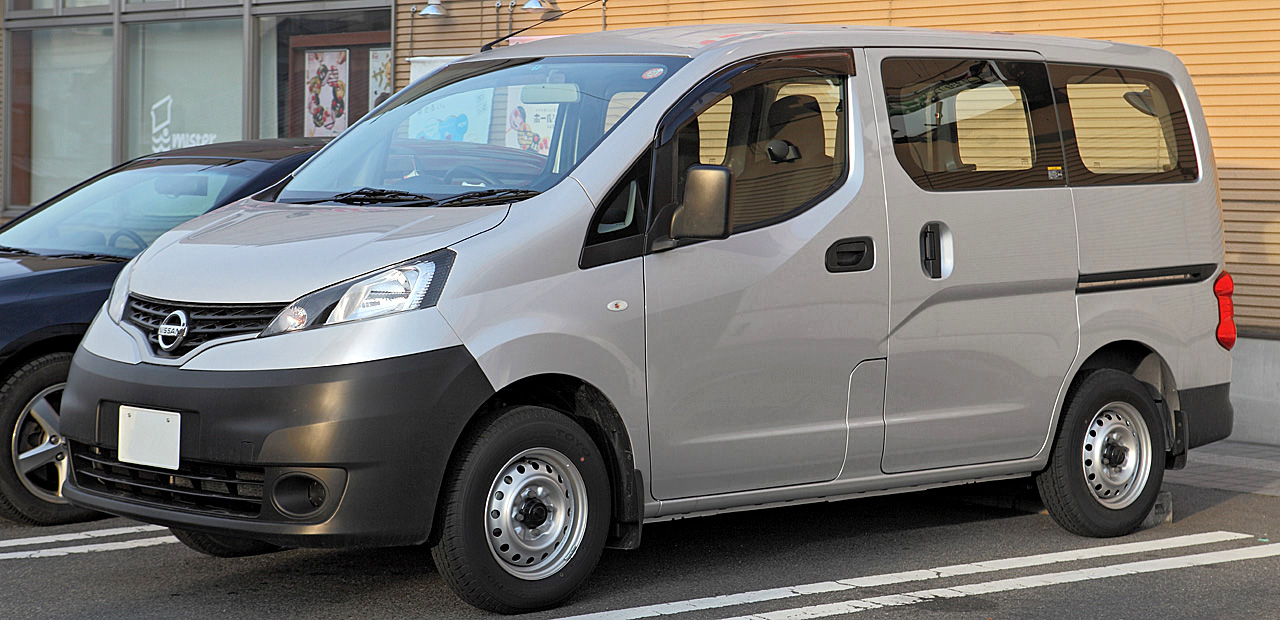
Nissan NV200

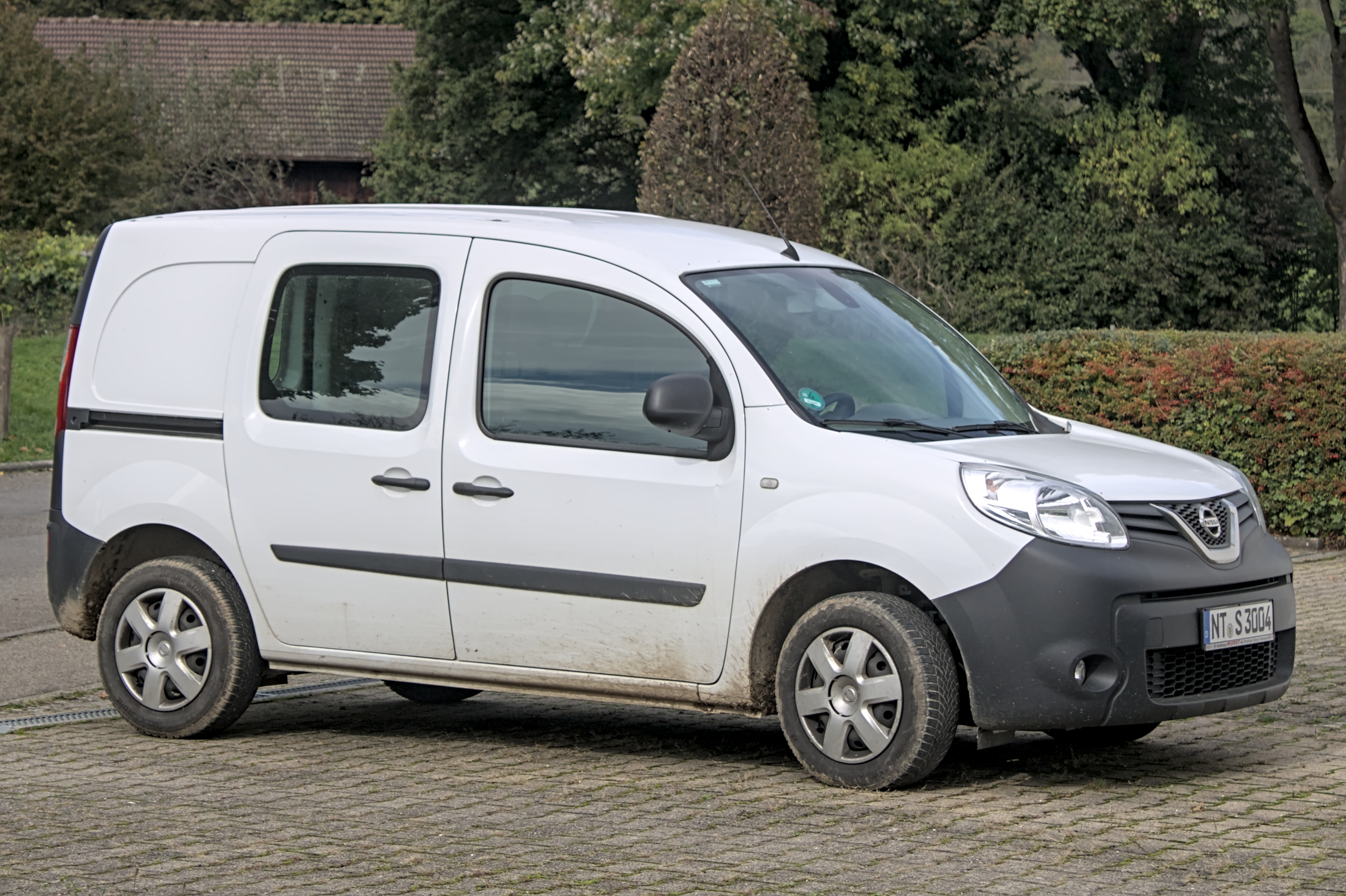
Nissan NV250

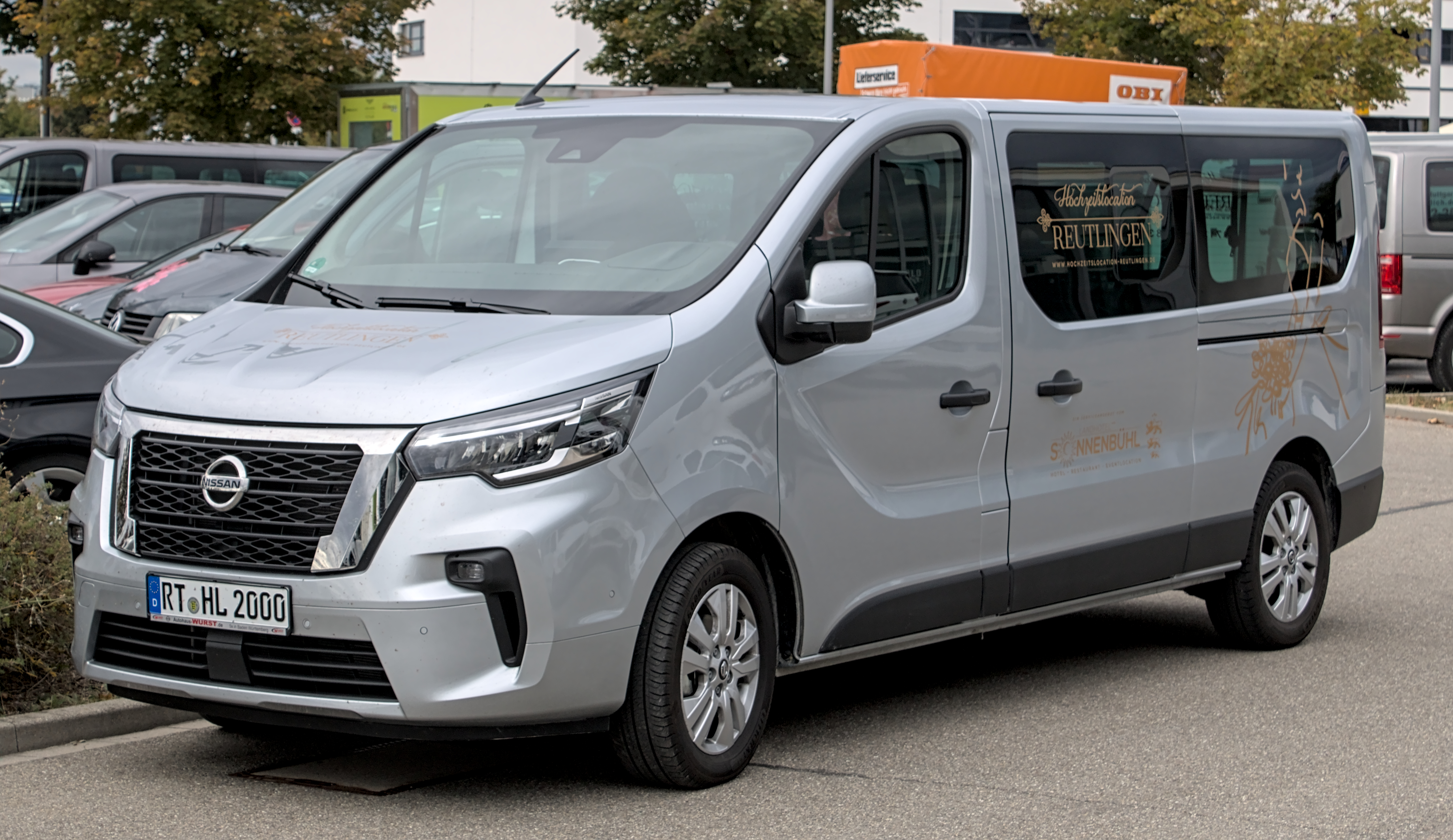
Nissan NV300

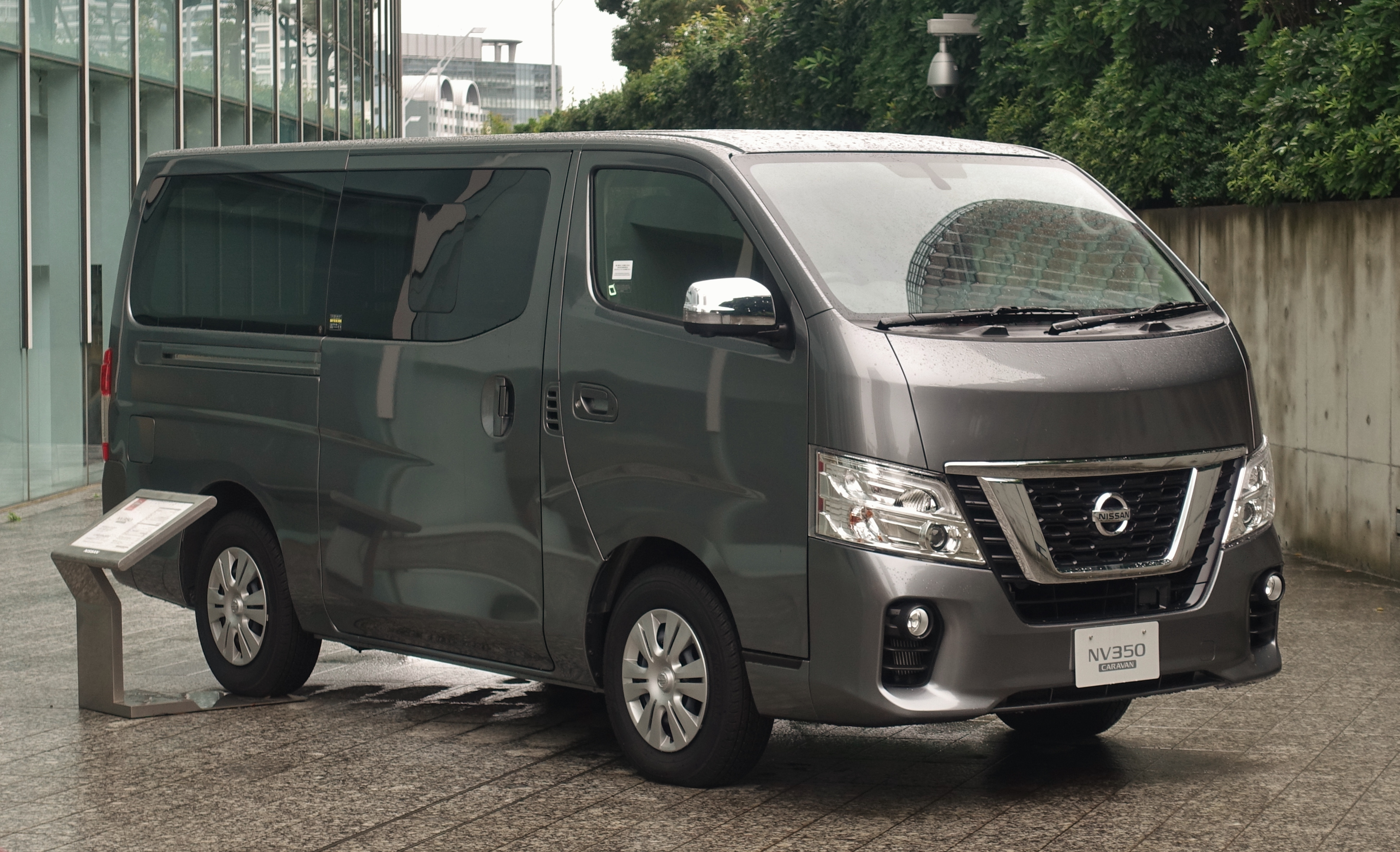
Nissan NV350 Caravan/NV350 Urvan

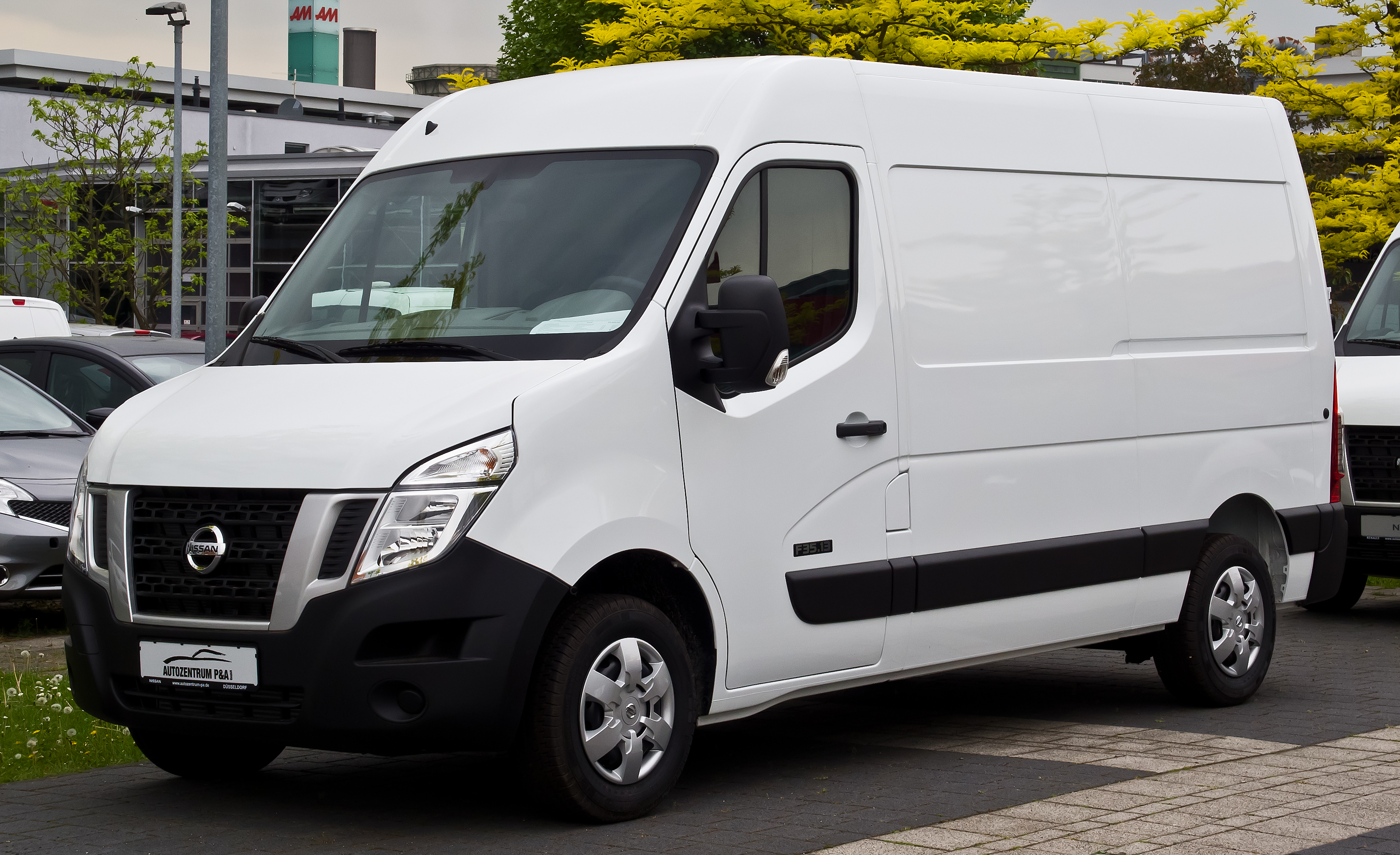
Nissan NV400

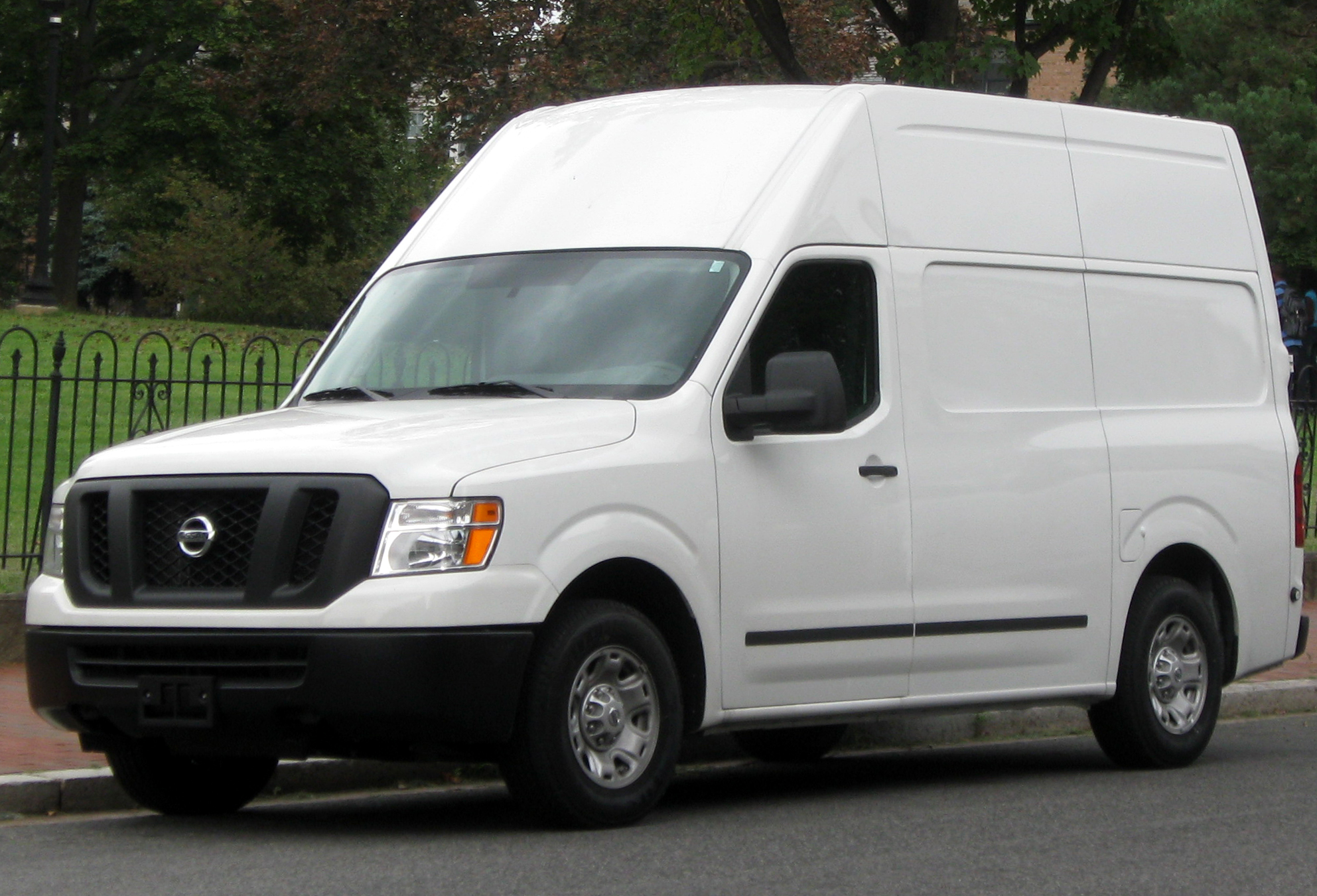
Nissan NV1500/NV2500/NV3500
