= Jüngling =

Origin
- Region of origin: Germany

Other names
- Variant forms: Juengling, Jungling, Yuengling, Yungling, Yingling

Jüngling is a surname of German origin. It has been anglicized as Juengling, Jungling, Yuengling, Yungling, and Yingling. Branches of this family currently exist throughout Europe, mostly concentrated in Germany, and in the United States. In Hungary, members of the Jüngling family are considered part of the nobility.

== Terminology ==
The name Jüngling is translated in English as "youth". As Peter N. Stearns writes in the Encyclopedia of Social History, "Linguistic designations for preindustrial youth were class and gender specific. In Germany, for example, adults used separate designations for upper-class boys (Jüngling) and girls (Jüngfrau). Jungling implied a romantic image of youthful innocence, idealism, and vulnerability."

In general German use, Jüngling is a young man, who is no longer a boy, but not yet grown up. In fine arts, including in literature and paintings, the Jüngling youth is often portrayed iconographically as a beardless, innocent yet attractive young male.

Der Jüngling in German literature is a German didactic poem about noble youth written in 1270 by Konrad von Haslau. It provides 1264 lines of instructions for young noblemen "that emphasized the more superficial aspects of proper behavior."

== People ==
Notable persons with this surname include:

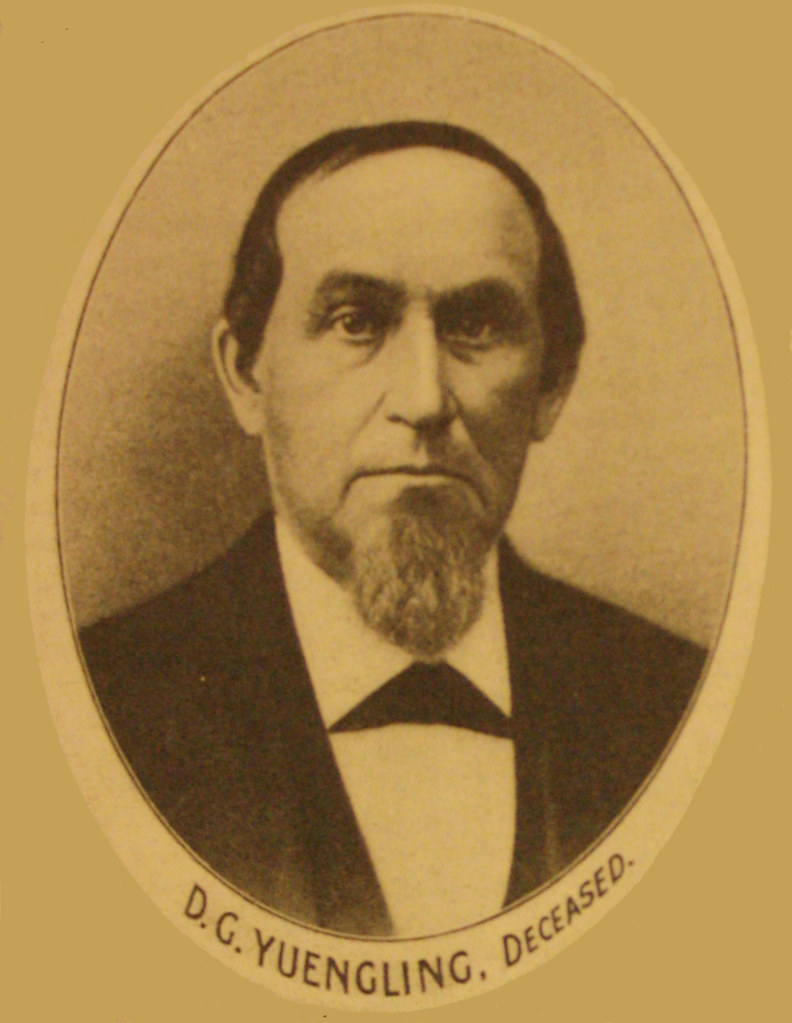
David G. Yuengling, born David Jüngling

=== Jüngling ===
- Johan Jüngling (1977), Swedish former squash player
- Max Jüngling (1903–1963), German politician

=== Juengling ===
- Frederick Juengling (1846–1889) (born Friedrich Jüngling), American wood engraver and painter

=== Yingling ===
- Charlie Yingling (1865–1897), American Major League Baseball shortstop; older brother of Joe Yingling
- Earl Yingling (1888–1962), American Major League Baseball pitcher
- Joe Yingling (1867–1903), American Major League Baseball pitcher; younger brother of Charlie Yingling
- Paul Yingling, retired United States Army colonel, and outspoken critic of the Army General Corps
- Sam Yingling (born 1980), American politician

=== Yuengling ===
The Yuengling beer family (listed chronologically):

- David Yuengling (1808–1877), German-American businessman and brewer, the founder and first president of America's oldest brewery, D. G. Yuengling & Son
- Frederick Yuengling (1848–1899), American businessman and second president and owner of America's oldest brewery, D. G. Yuengling & Son
- Richard Yuengling Sr. (1915–1999), American businessman, the president and owner of the Pottsville, Pennsylvania brewer, Yuengling
- Richard "Dick" Yuengling Jr. (born 1943) American billionaire businessman, the president and sole owner of the Pottsville, Pennsylvania brewer, Yuengling

== Places and businesses ==
Places and businesses associated with the Yuengling beer family include:

- Frank D. Yuengling Mansion, a historic home located at Pottsville, Schuylkill County, Pennsylvania built in 1913
- Yuengling, or D. G. Yuengling & Son, the oldest operating American brewing company established in 1829.
- Yuengling Bicentennial Park and Gardens, a city park located in Pottsville, Pennsylvania, United States
- Yuengling Center, formerly known as the USF Sun Dome, a multi-purpose facility on the campus of the University of South Florida (USF) in Tampa, Florida

== See also ==
- Gesang der Jünglinge (literally "Song of the Youths"), the electronic music work by Karlheinz Stockhausen
- The Vienna Jüngling statue, called The Youth of Magdalensberg in English
- Der Jüngling, German title for The Raw Youth, also published as The Adolescent or An Accidental Family, a novel by Russian writer Fyodor Dostoevsky
- Der Jüngling und der Greis (article in German Wikipedia) (meaning The Young and the Old Man), most likely written by Friedrich Schiller published in 1782 in the form of a dialogue between the age-wise Almar and the young fanatical Selim on the meaning of life. The different views of the two illustrate the dual world view of the author.
- Yngling, the oldest known Scandinavian dynasty
