= Yuengling Bicentennial Park and Gardens =

- Interactive map of Yuengling Bicentennial Park and Gardens
- Location: S 11th St., Pottsville, PA 17901
- Nearest city: Pottsville, Pennsylvania
- Coordinates: 40°40′52″N 76°12′9″W
- Area: 1.34 acres (0.54 ha)
- Created: September 10, 2005
- Operator: City of Pottsville
- Status: Currently active

The Yuengling Bicentennial Park and Gardens (/ˈjɪŋlɪŋ/ YING-ling) is a city park located in Pottsville, Pennsylvania, United States, which originally opened in the late 1800s and then again in 2005.

== History ==
The D.G. Yuengling and Son brewing company was founded in Pottsville in 1829 by David Yuengling, a German immigrant.

The original water source for the company was a hillside spring several blocks west of the brewery. The land around the springhouse was made into a park in the late 1800s. When water demand outstripped the spring's capacity in the 1960s, however, the company began using city water instead and shut down the park and springhouse.

== Contemporary development ==
In 2002, Richard "Dick" Yuengling Jr. donated the land and spring to the city of Pottsville. The park had become abandoned and overgrown and the city took on its redevelopment. Yuengling Jr. had been approached by the Lasting Legacy for Pottsville Foundation and the Bicentennial Committee to start discussions about the donation. Yuengling Jr. stated it was fitting the city should have the land "because it was the source of Pottsville's first water supply", and "Why shouldn't the city have it? It will certainly enhance the quality of life for those living near it."

When the renovations were completed in the Spring of 2004, the park featured footpaths, wooden bridges, gazebos, waterfalls and gardens. The park was the first urban green space created in Pottsville in "recent history". The price of creating the park was approximately $350,000, and local company Prodesign Plus helped work on design and construction. All money spent on upgrading the park was funded by private donations.

The ground breaking of the park was held on June 10, 2004, and the ribbon cutting ceremony to officially open the park was on September 10, 2005.

In 2012, Lasting Legacy spent an estimated $20,000 installing a bathroom in the park. Deborah "Debbie" Yuengling Ferhat, Richard L. Yuengling Jr.'s daughter, sits on the board at Lasting Legacy.

Wild animals, including rabbits, can still be seen in the park.
