= Yngling (disambiguation) =

The Ynglings were one of the oldest known Scandinavian dynasties.

Yngling or similar terms may also refer to one of the following:

- Yngling (keelboat), a type of sailboat.
- Ynglinga saga
- Ynglingatal
- The Yngling, a novel and serial by John Dalmas

== See also ==
- Yuengling, the oldest operating brewing company in the United States
- Jüngling, a German surname also spelled as Yingling or Yuengling
- Ynglism, a neopagan Slavic religion
