= Mount Carbon, Pennsylvania =

Borough in Pennsylvania, US

- Borough
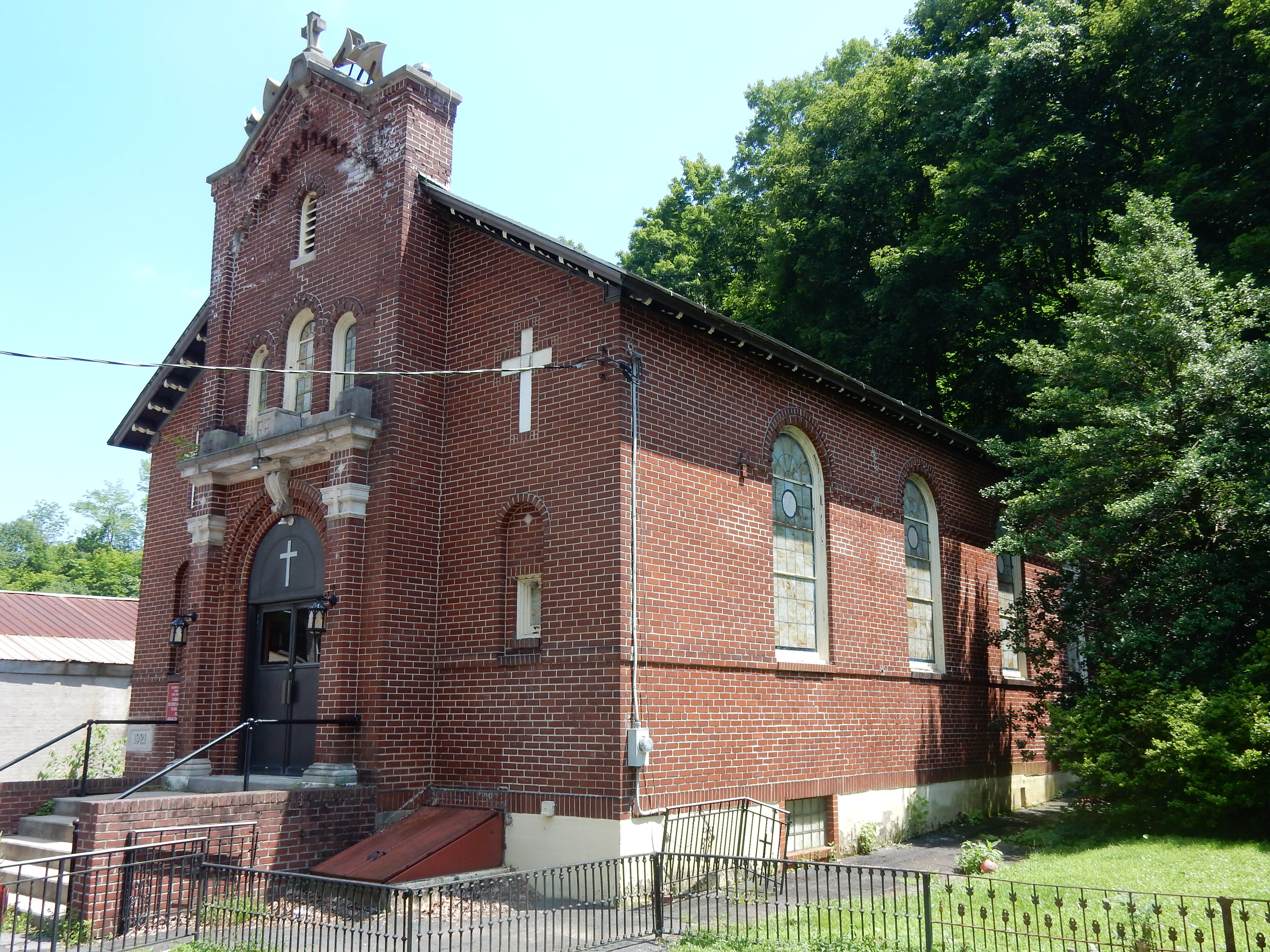
- St. Francis De Sales Church on Main St.

- Location of Mount Carbon in Schuylkill County, Pennsylvania.

- Location in Pennsylvania Mount Carbon (the United States)
- Coordinates: 40°40′21″N 76°11′15″W
- Country: United States
- State: Pennsylvania
- County: Schuylkill
- Settled: 1828
- Incorporated: 1864

Government
  - Type: Borough Council
  - Mayor: John Raess

Area
  - Total: 0.069 sq mi (0.18 km^{2})
  - Land: 0.069 sq mi (0.18 km^{2})
  - Water: 0 sq mi (0.00 km^{2})

Population (2020)
  - Total: 91
  - Density: 1,319/sq mi (509.2/km^{2})
- Time zone: UTC-5 (Eastern (EST))
  - Summer (DST): UTC-4 (EDT)
- ZIP Code: 17901
- Area code: 570
- FIPS code: 42-51488

Mount Carbon is a borough in Schuylkill County, Pennsylvania, United States, two miles south of Pottsville. It was formed from North Manheim Township in 1864. The population was 88 in the 2020 census. The borough is the smallest municipality in Schuylkill County.

== The old Mount Carbon Brewery ==
The borough was home for many years to the Mount Carbon Brewery, which closed in the late 1970s. D.G. Yuengling & Son bought the rights to use the Mount Carbon (Bavarian) name and label when Mount Carbon Brewery went out of business in 1977. Yuengling brewed Mount Carbon for a short time but eventually abandoned it. 7up bottling Co. then took over the building for years as a distribution and shipping point.

== Government ==
Mount Carbon has also had one of the youngest mayors in history; Mayor Jeffrey Dunkel was sworn in as mayor when he was only 18 years old. On July 16, 2015, The Pottsville Republican Herald reported that Mayor Dunkel will resign after 13 years for a job opportunity in another state. He was succeeded by Donna Porter, who also resigned after moving outside the borough.

The borough was considering a merger with the City of Pottsville. The merger was shot down by the residents, and the borough has been making financial progress since a new council took the helm. In 2019, the borough had no functioning government after the borough secretary resigned and three borough council members quit. That year, John Raess was elected mayor by two write-in votes and borough council member by five write-in votes. Raess was the only person to show up to the borough council reorganization meeting, meaning there would be no functioning government in 2020. As a result, Mount Carbon may have to merge with Pottsville, which would need to be approved by voters in both municipalities. Another option would be to merge with North Manheim Township, though that would force the borough to change school districts.

== Transportation ==
Mount Carbon was the terminus of the original Philadelphia and Reading Railway, opened in 1842. Mount Carbon was a very active location along the Canal. The hotel which was located at the present Pottsville Pizzeria, was rumored to have royalty stay there on their travels.

South Centre Street, Main Street, Sherwood Drive and the Mt. Carbon Arch are the only streets of the borough. Pennsylvania Route 61 passes to the east of Mount Carbon and access is provided by a bridge over the Schuylkill River. The Reading Blue Mountain and Northern Railroad operates along the former tracks of the Philadelphia and Reading Railway, later known as the Reading Company.

== Geography ==
Mount Carbon is located at 40°40′21″N 76°11′15″W (40.672364, -76.187494).

According to the United States Census Bureau, the borough has a total area of 0.1 square miles (0.2 km^{2}), all land.

== Demographics ==
Historical population
Census	Pop.	Note	%±
1870	364		—
1880	327		−10.2%
1890	333		1.8%
1900	252		−24.3%
1910	335		32.9%
1920	331		−1.2%
1930	311		−6.0%
1940	335		7.7%
1950	302		−9.9%
1960	308		2.0%
1970	184		−40.3%
1980	157		−14.7%
1990	132		−15.9%
2000	87		−34.1%
2010	91		4.6%
2020	91		0.0%
2021 (est.)	88	▼	−3.3%

As of the census of 2000, there were 87 people, 39 households, and 23 families residing in the borough. The population density was 1,414.1 inhabitants per square mile (546.0/km^{2}). There were 47 housing units at an average density of 763.9 per square mile (294.9/km^{2}). The racial makeup of the borough was 100.00% White.

There were 39 households, out of which 23.1% had children under the age of 18 living with them, 41.0% were married couples living together, 12.8% had a female householder with no husband present, and 41.0% were non-families. 35.9% of all households were made up of individuals, and 17.9% had someone living alone who was 65 years of age or older. The average household size was 2.23 and the average family size was 2.87.

In the borough the population was spread out, with 19.5% under the age of 18, 8.0% from 18 to 24, 33.3% from 25 to 44, 26.4% from 45 to 64, and 12.6% who were 65 years of age or older. The median age was 40 years. For every 100 females there were 102.3 males. For every 100 females age 18 and over, there were 100.0 males.

The median income for a household in the borough was $34,688, and the median income for a family was $46,875. Males had a median income of $24,000 versus $23,125 for females. The per capita income for the borough was $18,355. There were no families and 7.1% of the population living below the poverty line, including no under eighteens and 40.0% of those over 64.

== Early Mt. Carbon History ==
Among the first inhabitants of the settlement of Mt. Carbon were Lewis Murphy and Joseph Porter. The first dam for the Schuylkill Canal was built at Mount Carbon on the Schuylkill River in the spring of 1817. The entire canal was in operation by 1824.

By 1818, Necho Allen resided here, engaged in lumbering, and built a saw-mill. Although coal was to become the principal commodity transported on the canal, the company conveyed lumber and merchandise as well. By 1828 the village consisted of six homes, one store, an office building and a large stone warehouse, used to store produce, which was brought in wagons from surrounding counties to be sent to market in Philadelphia.

In 1829 John White (President of the Mt. Carbon Railroad) began the Mansion House construction here. During this same year, the Norwegian and Mount Carbon Railroad was incorporated and by April 1831, coal was being conveyed through Mt. Carbon from the rich coalfields north and west of present-day Pottsville to Philadelphia.

In 1842, the Philadelphia and Reading Railway Company had made Mt. Carbon the termination point of its railroad line from Philadelphia in direct competition with the Schuylkill Canal. The canal company was leased by the railroad in 1870 and the canal north of Port Clinton was abandoned at the signing of the lease. The Philadelphia and Reading Company leased the Mt. Carbon Railroad on May 16, 1862, and merged the line into the parent organization on June 13, 1872.

In 1849, geologist Isaac Lea discovered fossilized footprints of Sauropus in red sandstone in Mount Carbon. Lea contended the tracks were reptilian and that due to the level of strata where the footprints were found, they were from the Devonian Period between 360 and 408 million years old and constituted a new species that he named Sauropus primaevus. The footprints have since been identified as coming from an amphibian now known as Palaeosauropus primaevus from the Mississippian Age over 330 million years ago.

== Gallery ==
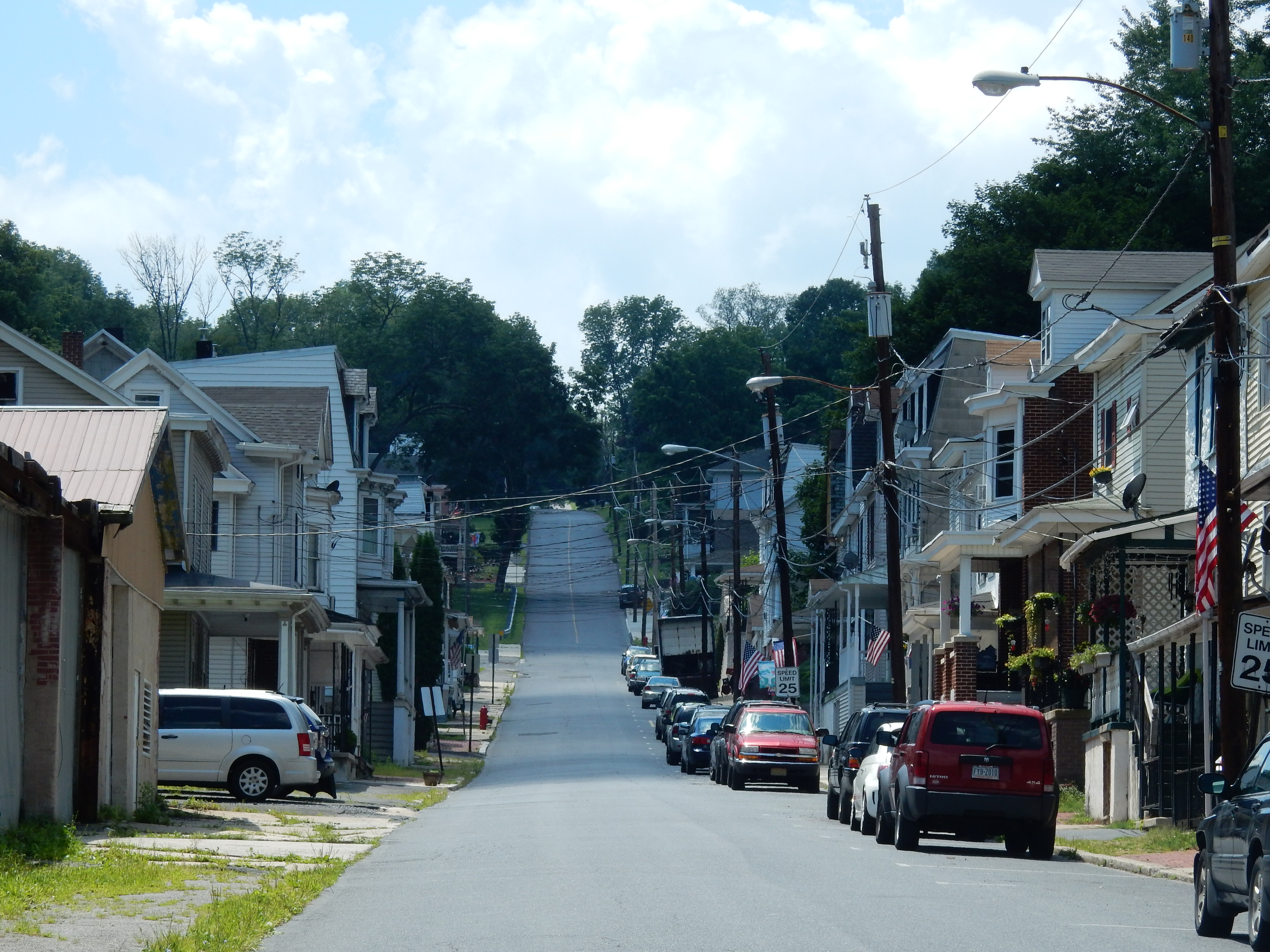
Main St. in Mount Carbon.

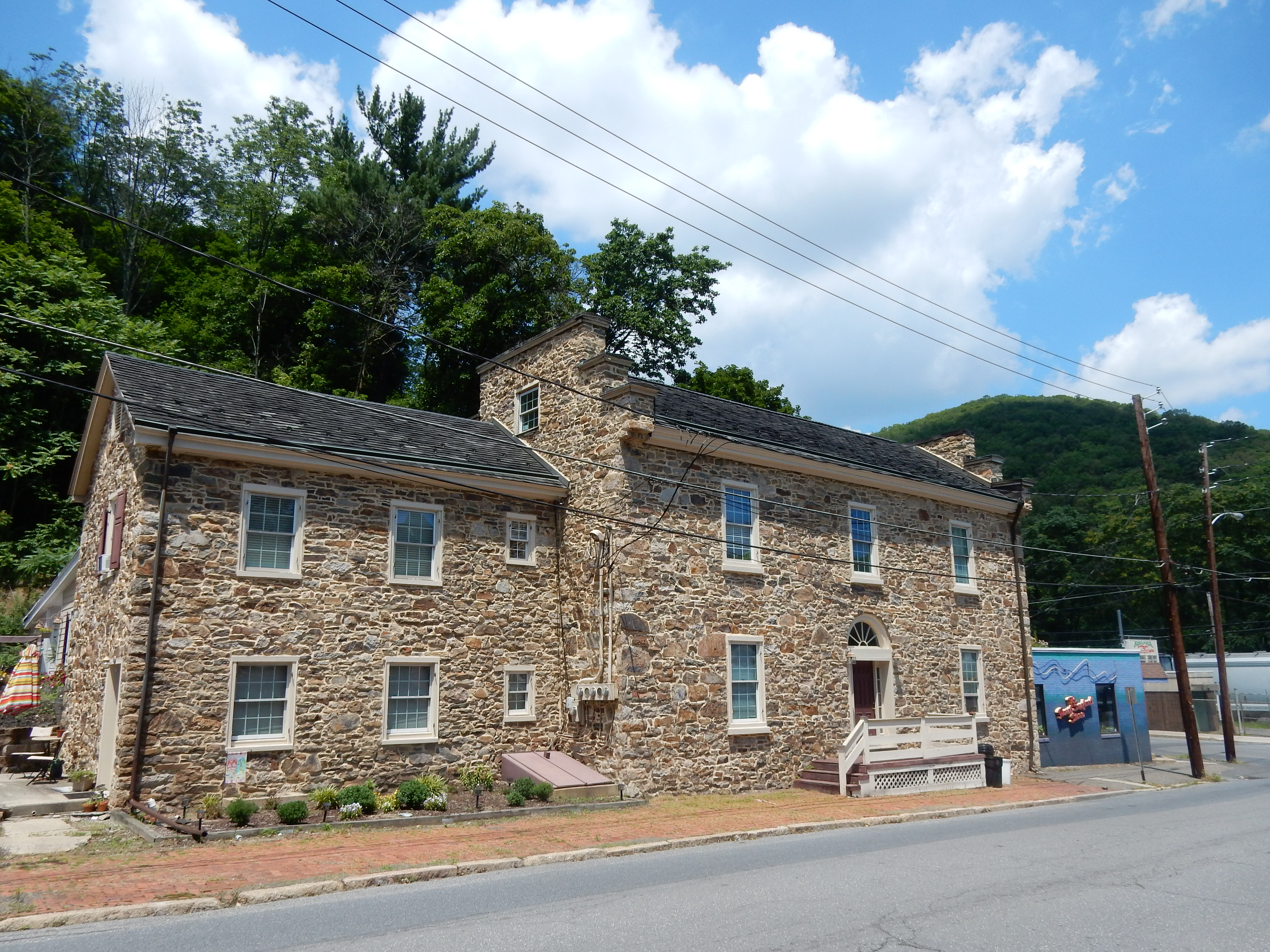
Residence on Main St.

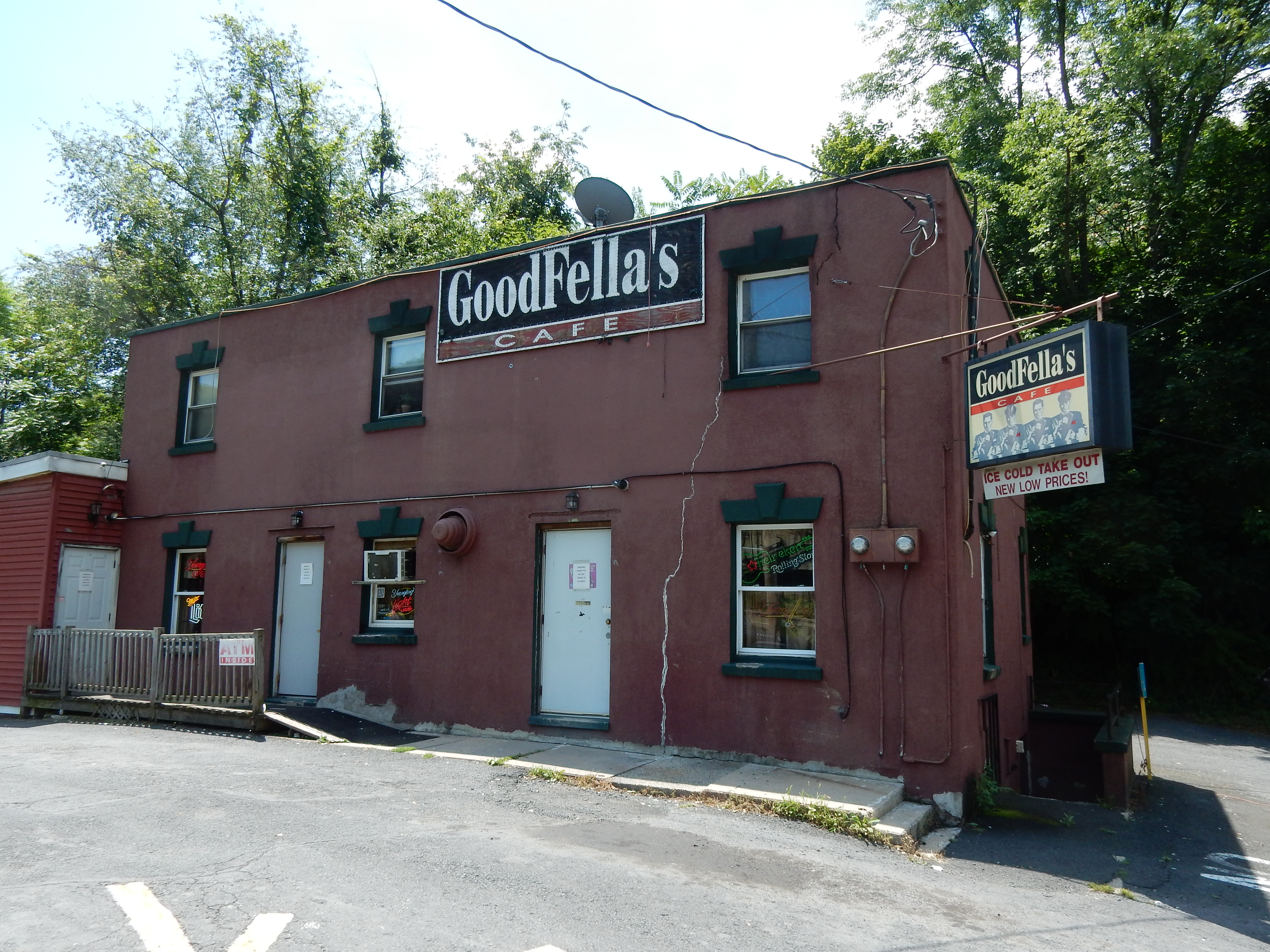
GoodFella's Cafe on Mt. Carbon Arch St.

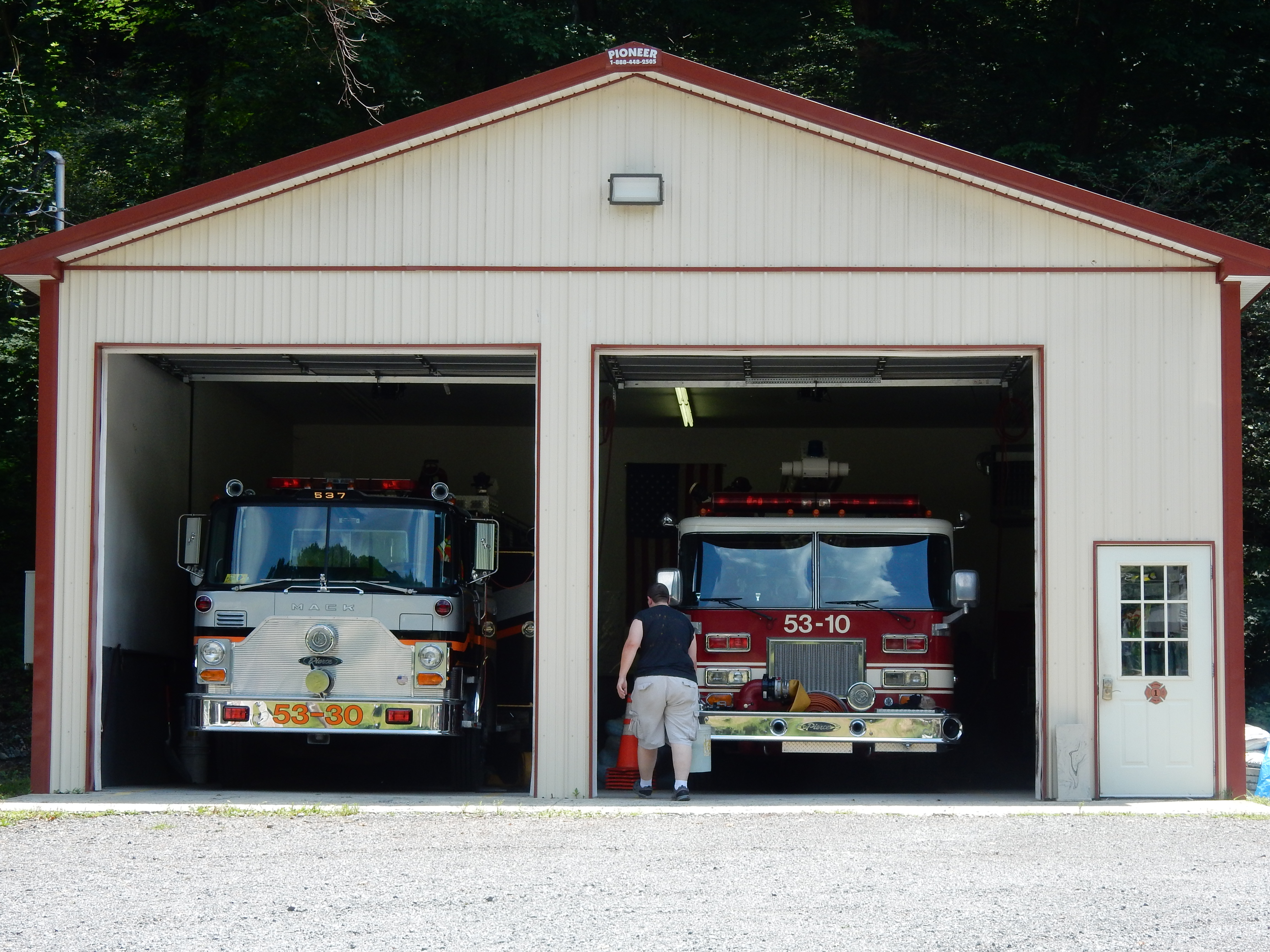
Mount Carbon Fire Station.

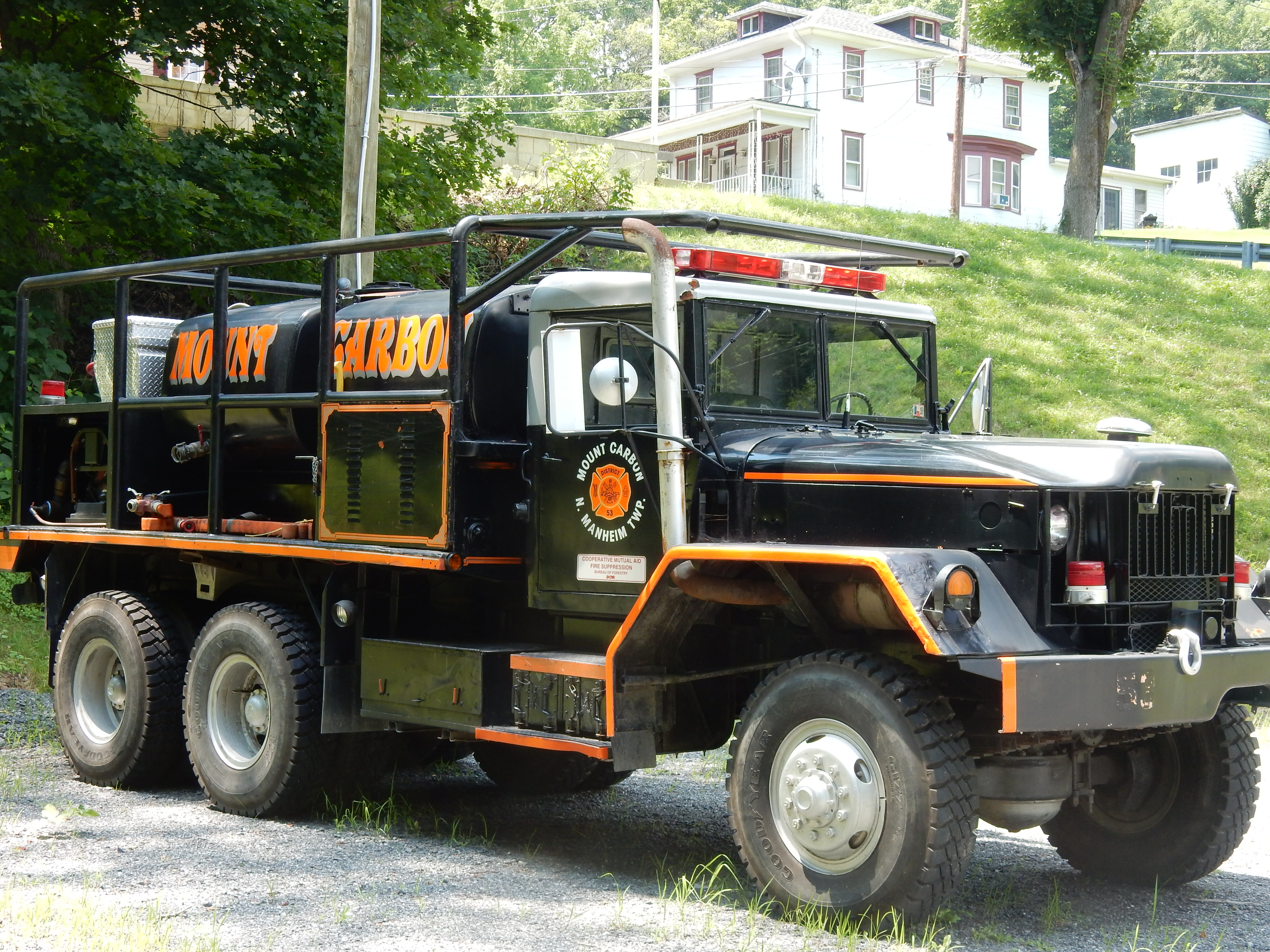
Historic Firefighter truck.

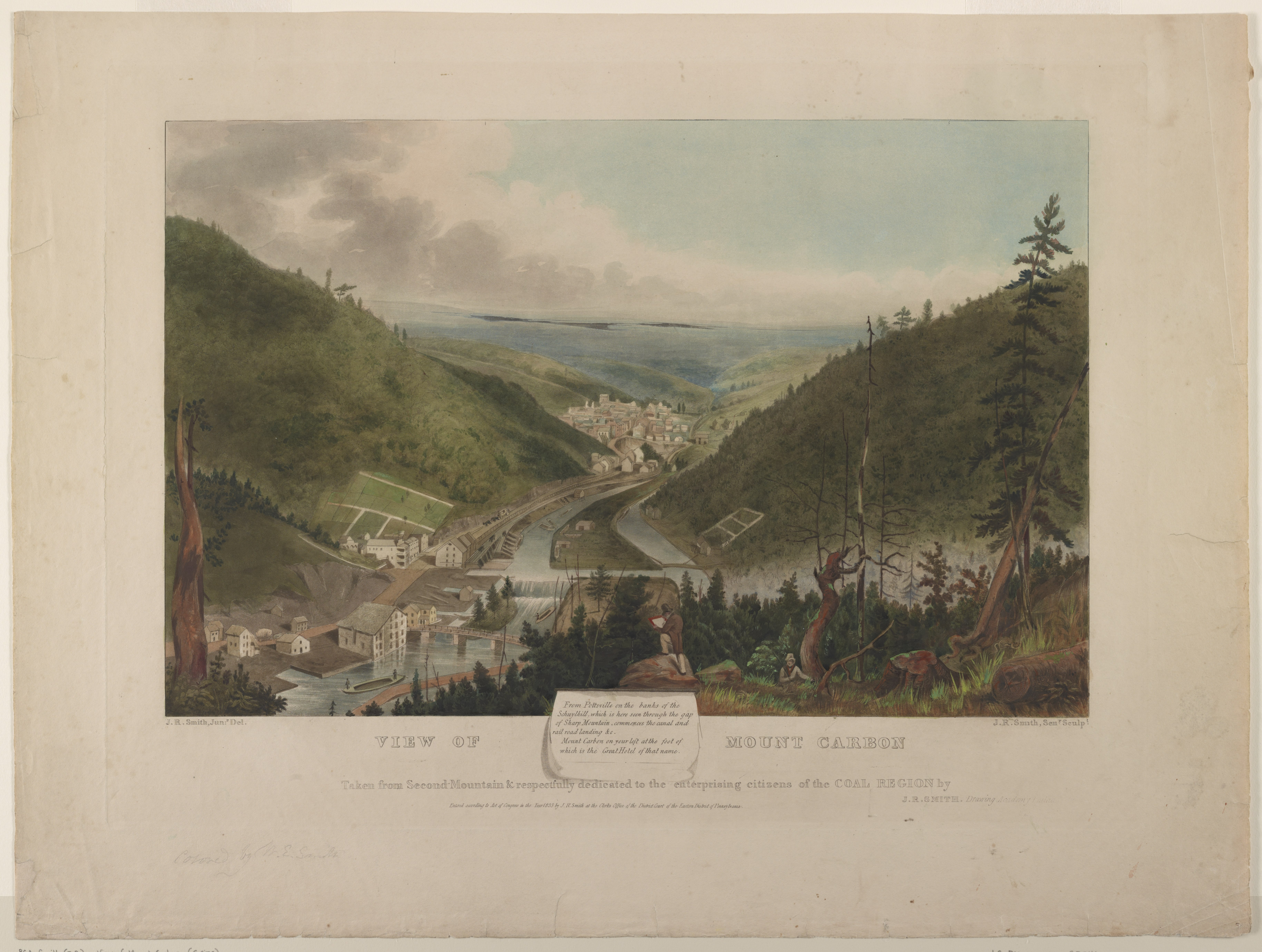
Painting of Mount Carbon, Pennsylvania by John Rowson Smith engraved by his father John Rubens Smith.

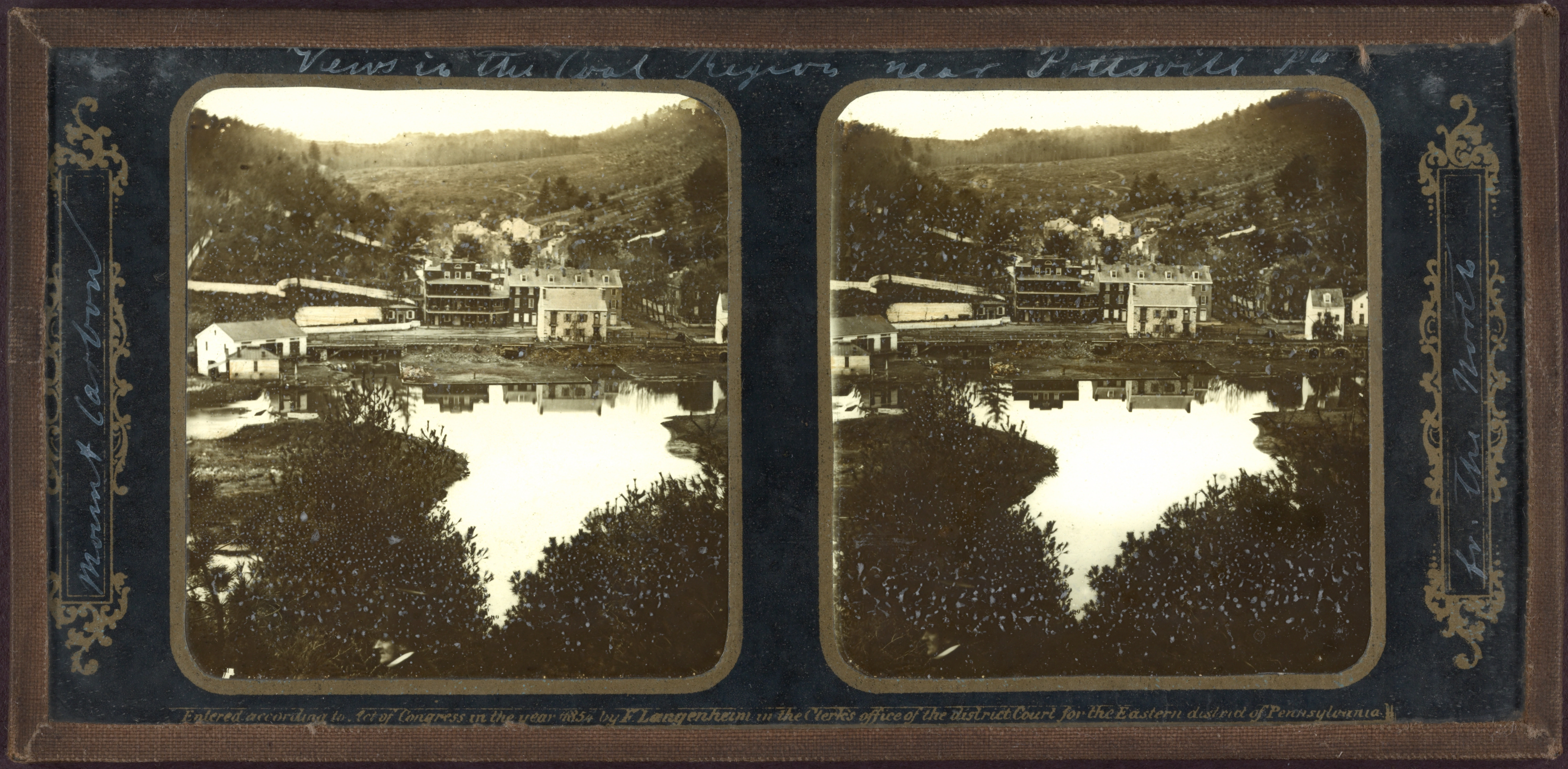
Mount Carbon, PA, 1800s (undated).
