= Frank D. Yuengling Mansion =

Historic house in Pennsylvania, United States

- U.S. National Register of Historic Places
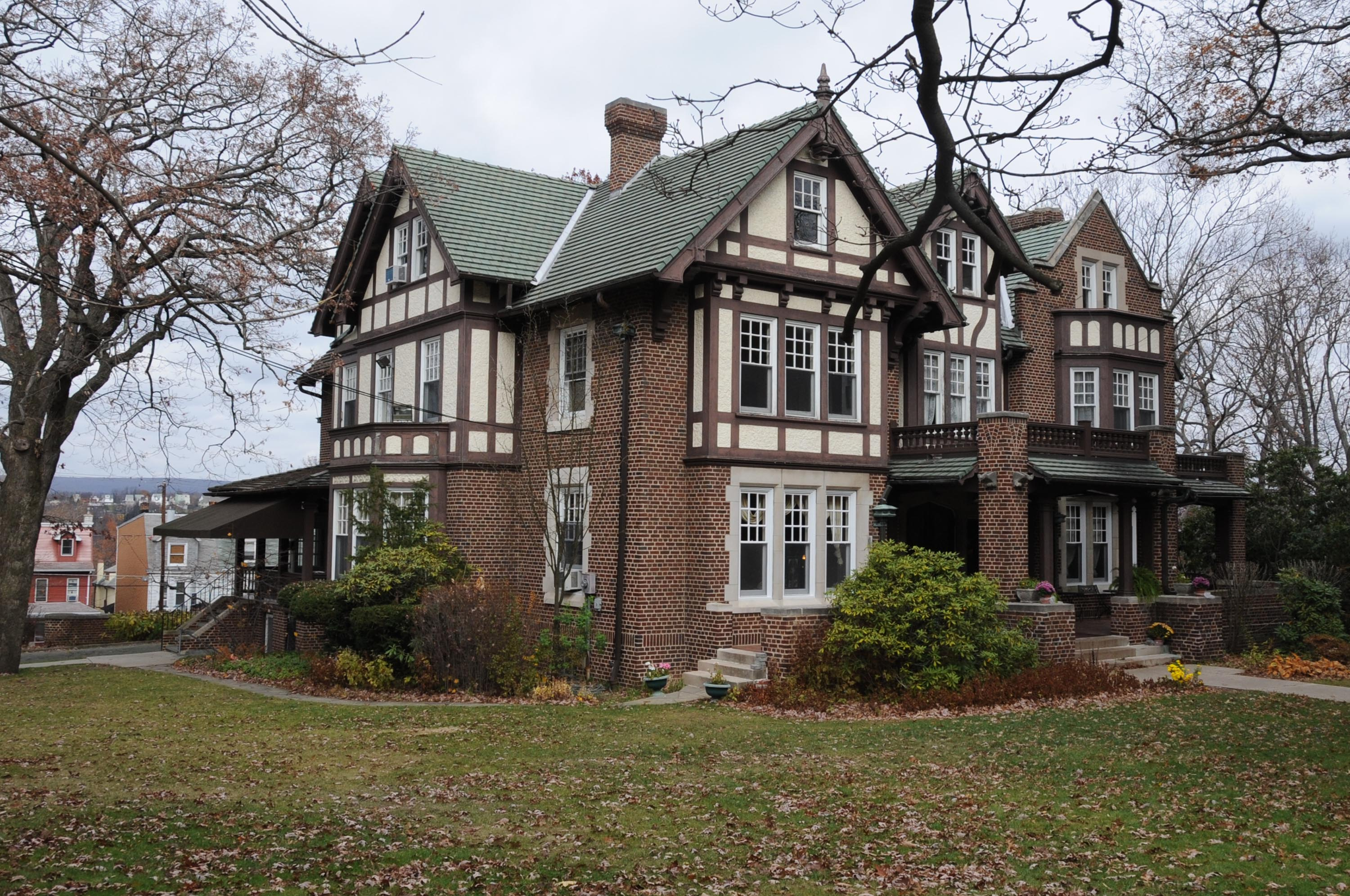
- Frank D. Yuengling Mansion, November 2008

- Location within Pennsylvania Location within the United States
- Location: 1440 Mahantongo St., Pottsville, Pennsylvania
- Coordinates: 40°40′43″N 76°12′30″W
- Area: 1.7 acres (0.69 ha)
- Built: 1913
- Architect: Harry Maurer
- Architectural style: Tudor-Jacobean
- NRHP reference No.: 79002342
- Added to NRHP: April 18, 1979

Frank D. Yuengling Mansion is a historic home located in Pottsville, Schuylkill County, Pennsylvania. It was built in 1913, and is a large three-story dwelling in the Tudor-Jacobean style. It is constructed of brick, stucco, and half-timbering and contains 20-plus rooms. It features side and rear porches, a front portico, stone facing, and many gables, overhanging balconies, and brick chimneys. Also located on the property are a contributing Jacobean style garage, formal garden with decorative statuary and sundial, and sunken garden with gazebo. The house was the first house to have a telephone and electricity in at Pottsville, Schuylkill County, Pennsylvania. It was built by Frank D. Yuengling of the Yuengling brewery, grandson of David Yuengling. The house is used as a cultural center and education facility, managed by the Schuylkill County Council For The Arts.

It was added to the National Register of Historic Places in 1979.

== Photographs ==
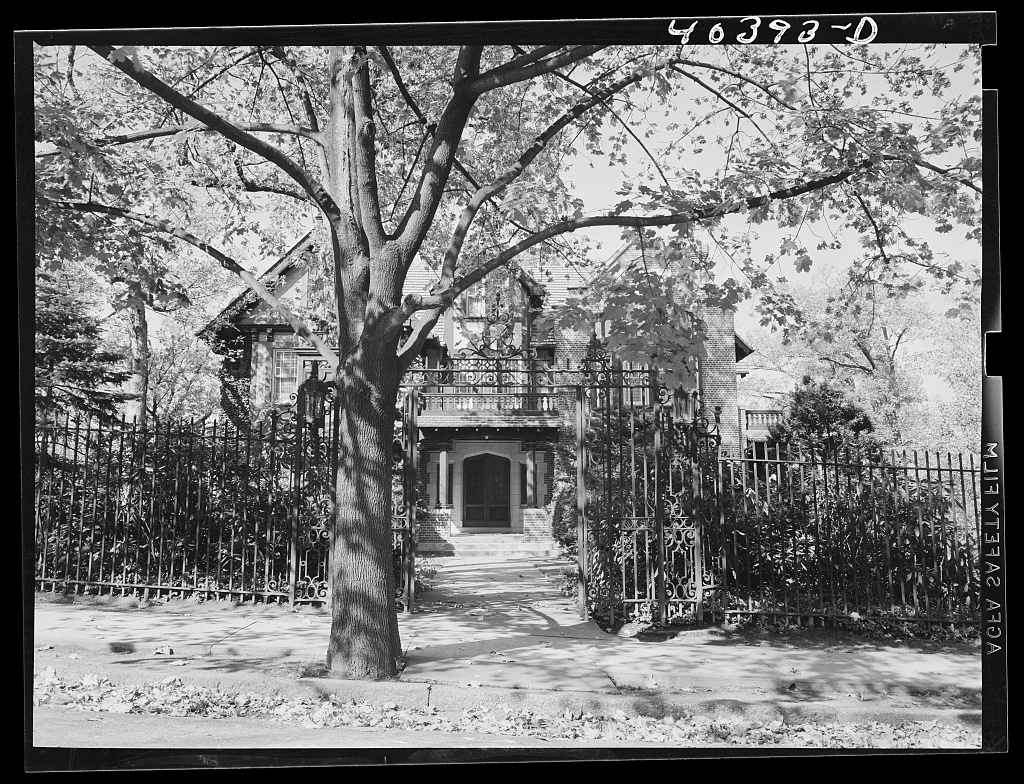
The Frank D. Yuengling mansion in Pottsville as photographed by Sheldon Dick in 1938 for the U.S. Farm Security Administration (U.S. Library of Congress, public domain).
