= Hôtel de Ville, Cournon-d'Auvergne =

Town hall in Cournon-d'Auvergne, France

Hôtel de Ville
- The main frontage of the Hôtel de Ville in October 2022

General information
- Type: City hall
- Architectural style: Renaissance style
- Location: Cournon-d'Auvergne, France
- Coordinates: 45.7419°N 3.1995°E
- Completed: c.1660

The Hôtel de Ville (French pronunciation: [otɛl də vil], City Hall) is a municipal building in Cournon-d'Auvergne, Puy-de-Dôme, in central France, standing on Place de la Mairie.

== History ==
The first building in the centre of the town was a château commissioned by the first seigneur of Cournon in the 12th century. This was destroyed during a dispute between the bishop of Clermont, Robert of Auvergne, who was a supporter of King Philip II, and Count William IX of Auvergne, who was a supporter of Richard I of England, in 1197 during the First Hundred Years' War. It was rebuilt by Guillaume de Cournon in 1199 but fell into disrepair over the next five centuries.

A water engineer of Czech descent, Octavio de Strada, became the seigneur after buying the rights to the estate in 1652 and 1654. Octavio carried out land consolidation and drainage works around Lake Sarliève. After Octavio died in 1655, his son, Jean de Strada, became the seigneur and went on to commission the current château in around 1660. It remained in private ownership until it was acquired by the council in 1852.

The design involved a symmetrical main frontage of five bays facing onto the town square with the end bays projected forward. The central section of three bays featured three square-headed doorways on the ground floor, three French doors on the first floor and three casement windows on the second floor. There was a balcony on the first floor and the end bays were fenestrated in a similar style. The side elevations featured round towers with conical roofs. Internally, the principal room was the Salle du Conseil (council chamber) on the ground floor.

The Brothers of the Christian Schools established two classrooms on the first floor of the building under the direction of Brother Jean Baptiste Sauveplane in 1862. A state boys' school took over the first floor classrooms in 1889 and the main frontage of the building was modernised with the windows becoming more widely spaced and a clock being installed above the central bay towards the end of the century. A war memorial in the form of four marble columns supporting an entablature and a stone carving of a Croix de Guerre intended to commemorate the lives of local service personnel who had died in the First World War was installed in front of the building in the 1920s.
