= Mount Carbon Brewery =

American brewery

The Mount Carbon Brewery was a brewery located at 716 South Centre Street, Pottsville, Pennsylvania, and which ran from 1845 to 1976 under various owners and names. Their Motto was "A Mellow Brew from the Mountains".

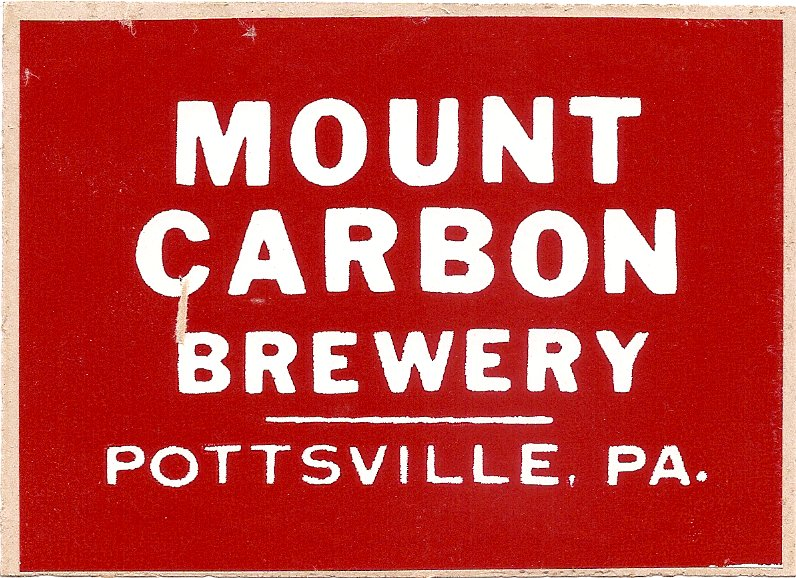
Mount Carbon Brewery, Pottsville, PA

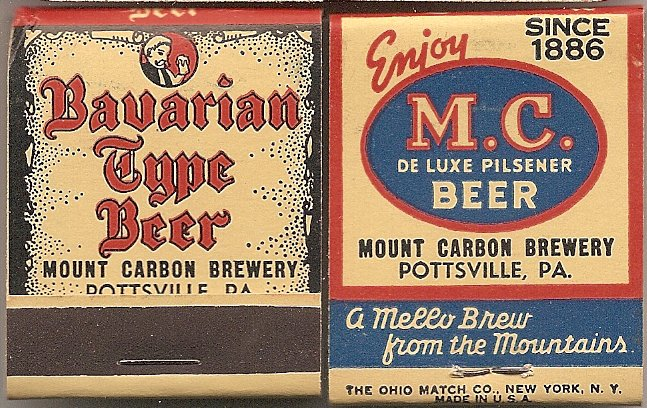
Mount Carbon Brewery matches with "Bavarian Type Beer" and "M.C. Deluxe Pilsner Beer".

== Timeline ==
- George Lauer circa 1845–1860. Orchard Brewery, so named for the Orchard section of Pottsville.
- Frederick Lauer (Mauck Chunk & Jackson Sts) 18??-1877
- Orchard Brewery 1877–1893. Operated by G. Lorenz Schmidt until his death.

A new brewery was built in 1886 in Mount Carbon by Lorenz Schmidt. Some facilities of the Orchard Brewery were used in the new Brewery.

- Operated under Estate of Lorenz Schmidt, Mount Carbon Brewery (Main St, Mount Carbon) 1893–1906.
- Schmidt Estate Brewing Co., Mount Carbon Brewery 1906-1908
- Mellet & Nichter Brewing Co. 1908-1920
- Prohibition in 1920-1933
- Matthew Kelley, trading as Mt. Carbon Brewery 1933-1935
- Mount Carbon Brewery, 1935-1976

== Products ==
The following brand names were produced at the Mount Carbon Brewery. Production ceased in 1976 and brand licensing was sold to D. G. Yuengling & Son.

- Mount Carbon Ale 1933 - 1951
- Mount Carbon Beer 1933 - 1951
- Double Pilsener Beer 1934 - 1938
- Mount Carbon Half & Half 1934 - 1939
- Mount Carbon Bock 1934 - 1941
- Mount Carbon Münchner Style October Beer 1935 - 1941
- Mount Carbon Lager Beer (Under Matthew Kelly)
- Mount Carbon Pale Ale
- M.C. Ale 1935 - 1943
- M.C. Bock 1935 - 1943
- M.C. Porter 1935 - 1943
- M.C. Beer 1935 - 1943
- M.C. De Luxe Pilsner Beer
- Franklin Ale 1935 - 1945
- Mount Carbon Porter 1935 - 1977
- Bavarian Type [Premium] Beer 1941 - 1977, continued to be produced by D.G. Yuengling & Son until 1994.
- Old German Beer 1942 - 1949, produced by D.G. Yuengling & Son until 1994.
- Old Bohemian Beer 1942 - 1977
- Dix Club Beer 1944 - 1947
- Old Dutch Beer 1944 - 1949
- Franklin Beer 1945 - 1948
- Lord Salisbury Ale 1945 - 1975
- Old Fashioned Beer 1947 - 1951
- Club Society Beer 1953 - 1956
- Bavarian Type Bock 1953 - 1977

== See also ==
- Mount Carbon, Pennsylvania, The old Mount Carbon Brewery.
