= Cournon-d'Auvergne =

- Commune
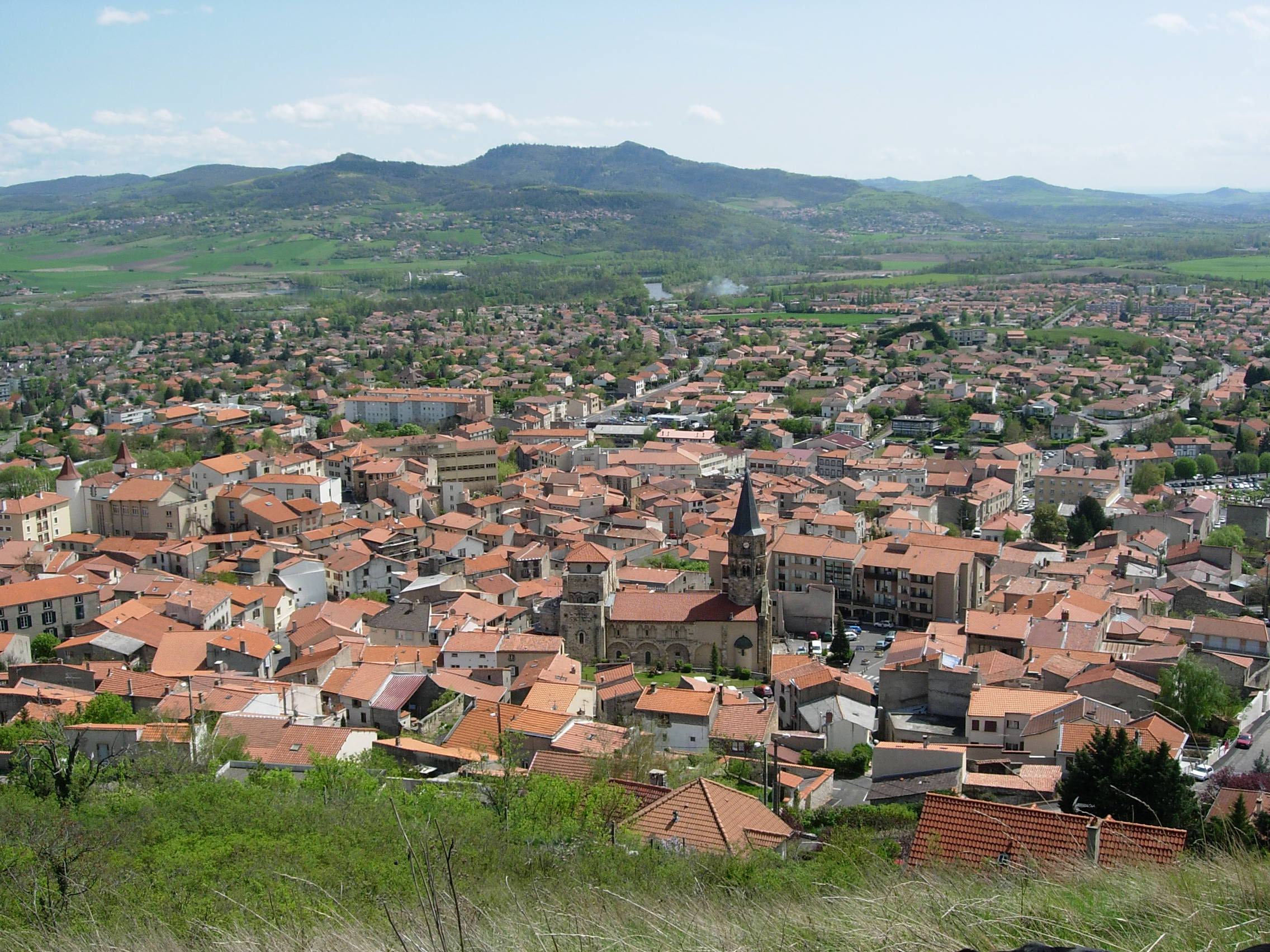
- Panoramic view of Cournon-d'Auvergne

- Coat of arms
- Location of Cournon-d'Auvergne
- Location within France Location within Auvergne-Rhône-Alpes
- Coordinates: 45°44′32″N 3°11′50″E
- Country: France
- Region: Auvergne-Rhône-Alpes
- Department: Puy-de-Dôme
- Arrondissement: Clermont-Ferrand
- Canton: Cournon-d'Auvergne
- Intercommunality: Clermont Auvergne Métropole

Government
  - Mayor (2026–32): Yanik Prière
- Area^{1}: 18.58 km^{2} (7.17 sq mi)
- Elevation: 352 m (1,155 ft)
- Highest elevation: 542 m (1,778 ft)
- Lowest elevation: 314 m (1,030 ft)
- Population (2023): 19,951
  - Density: 1,074/km^{2} (2,781/sq mi)
- Demonym: Cournonnais
- Time zone: UTC+01:00 (CET)
  - Summer (DST): UTC+02:00 (CEST)
- INSEE/Postal code: 63124 /63800
- Website: www.cournon-auvergne.fr
- ^{1} French Land Register data, which excludes lakes, ponds, glaciers > 1 km^{2} (0.386 sq mi or 247 acres) and river estuaries.

Cournon-d'Auvergne (French pronunciation: [kuʁnɔ̃ dovɛʁɲ]; lit. 'Cournon of Auvergne'; Auvergnat: Cornon d'Auvèrnhe) is a commune in the Puy-de-Dôme department in Auvergne-Rhône-Alpes in central France. It lies 10 km (6.2 mi) southeast of Clermont-Ferrand, the prefecture and largest city of Puy-de-Dôme, within Clermont Auvergne Métropole.

== History ==
The Hôtel de Ville

The Hôtel de Ville was commissioned by the de Strada family as a private residence in around 1660.

== Population ==
Historical population

Year	Pop.	±% p.a.
1793	2,124	—
1800	2,155	+0.21%
1806	2,591	+3.12%
1821	2,789	+0.49%
1831	2,664	−0.46%
1836	2,667	+0.02%
1841	2,607	−0.45%
1846	2,610	+0.02%
1851	2,539	−0.55%
1856	2,511	−0.22%
1861	2,522	+0.09%
1866	2,544	+0.17%
1872	2,413	−0.88%
1876	2,348	−0.68%
1881	2,270	−0.67%
1886	2,207	−0.56%
1891	2,261	+0.48%
1896	2,075	−1.70%
1901	1,811	−2.68%

Year	Pop.	±% p.a.
1906	1,683	−1.46%
1911	1,503	−2.24%
1921	1,552	+0.32%
1926	1,691	+1.73%
1931	1,584	−1.30%
1936	1,474	−1.43%
1946	1,616	+0.92%
1954	2,061	+3.09%
1962	3,135	+5.38%
1968	5,587	+10.11%
1975	12,583	+12.30%
1982	16,949	+4.35%
1990	19,156	+1.54%
1999	18,866	−0.17%
2007	18,501	−0.24%
2012	19,223	+0.77%
2017	20,043	+0.84%
2023	19,951	−0.08%

Source: EHESS and INSEE (1968–2023)

== Twin towns ==
- Lichtenfels, Germany, since 1992
- Ariccia, Italy, since 4 March 2000

== Ameneties ==
According to the cities official website, Cournon-d'Auvergne offers four nursery schools, four elementary schools, and two colleges for its inhabitants, as of 2024. The city host four municipal gymnasiums, a skatepark, and a sports park with two stadiums. The city also hosts multiple events such as sports and music festivals and a farmers market on the 3rd Sunday of each month.

== See also ==
- Communes of the Puy-de-Dôme department
