= Lichtenfels, Bavaria =

Lichtenfels
- Town
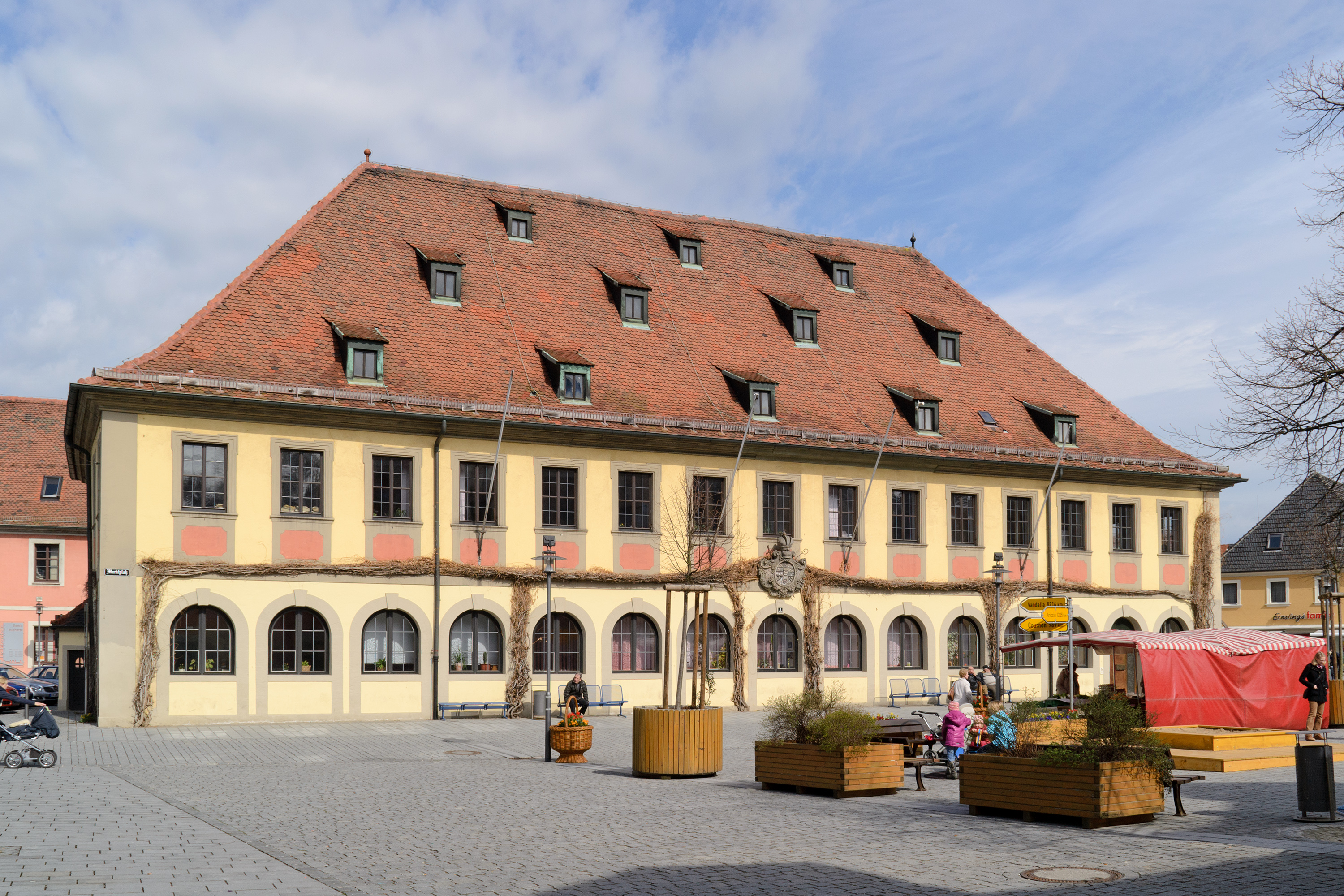
- Town hall

- Coat of arms

- Location of Lichtenfels within Lichtenfels district
- Interactive map of Lichtenfels
- Location within Germany Location within Bavaria
- Coordinates: 50°08′N 11°02′E
- Country: Germany
- State: Bavaria
- Admin. region: Oberfranken
- District: Lichtenfels

Government
  - Mayor (2020–26): Andreas Hügerich (SPD)

Area
  - Total: 122.16 km^{2} (47.17 sq mi)
- Elevation: 271 m (889 ft)

Population (2025-12-31)
  - Total: 20,452
  - Density: 167.42/km^{2} (433.62/sq mi)
- Time zone: UTC+01:00 (CET)
  - Summer (DST): UTC+02:00 (CEST)
- Postal codes: 96215
- Dialling codes: 09571
- Vehicle registration: LIF, STE
- Website: www.lichtenfels.de

Lichtenfels (German pronunciation: [ˈlɪçtn̩ˌfɛls]) is a town in the Upper Franconian region of Bavaria, Germany, the administrative seat of Lichtenfels district. It is chiefly known as the German "Basket City".

== Geography ==
It is situated on the upper course of the river Main, about 15 kilometres (9.3 mi) southeast of Coburg, and 30 kilometres (19 mi) northeast of Bamberg. The hilly landscape is called Gottesgarten am Obermain ("God's garden on the upper Main"), referring to the Basilica of the Fourteen Holy Helpers and Banz Abbey. The Maintal (valley of the Main) goes from East to West. The most important cities of the district are Burgkunstadt, Bad Staffelstein and the district city of Lichtenfels. The Rodach river, a tributary of the Main, runs through the area and reaches its greatest width in the northern part between Hochstadt am Main and Lichtenfels.

The district of Lichtenfels lies in the western part of the government region (Regierungsbezirk) of Oberfranken (Upper Franconia). It is surrounded by (from the north and clockwise) the districts of Coburg, Kronach, Kulmbach, Bayreuth and Bamberg.

The southern bank of the Main stretches up to the mountain range of the Franconian Jura (Fränkische Alb) beneath the Staffelberg close to Bad Staffelstein. The northern bank of the Main stretches up to the Itz-Baunach Highlands.

=== Administrative division ===
The town is divided into several districts:

Buch am Forst, Degendorf, Eichig, Gnellenroth, Hammer, Isling, Klosterlangheim, Kösten, Köttel, Krappenroth, Lahm, Mistelfeld, Mönchkröttendorf, Oberlangheim, Oberwallenstadt, Reundorf, Roth, Rothmannsthal, Schney, Schönsreuth, Seehof, Seubelsdorf, Stetten, Stöcken, Tiefenroth, Trieb, Unterwallenstadt und Weingarten.

== History ==
Lichtenfels was first mentioned in 1142 and chartered in 1231. That was titled and conferred from Otto III, Count Palatine of Burgundy.

After the expiration of the Meranians (Meranier) in 1248 Lichtenfels became part of the Prince-Bishopric of Bamberg (Hochstift Bamberg). With those and with the Secularization in 1802 incorporate to the Prince-electorate (Kurfürstentum) and later to the Kingdom of Bavaria (Königreich Bayern).

The Lichtenfelser are also called, in a sneering kind of way, the scoopers of the pool (Tümpelschöpfer). This name they obtained from the Thirty Years' War (1618–1648), from attempting to retrieve hidden sunken treasures in a pond, which they could not empty out due to rapidly running groundwater.

== Economy ==
Owing to the success of numerous local middle class enterprises, the town of 20,000 has an above average occupational quota.

The backbone of the local economy is formed by businesses in various industry sectors such as manufacturing, with an upholstery industry and its suppliers as well as wood processing and the production of foamed material. Other businesses include machine and tool fabrication, laser technology and one international cargo carrier.

=== Basket making ===
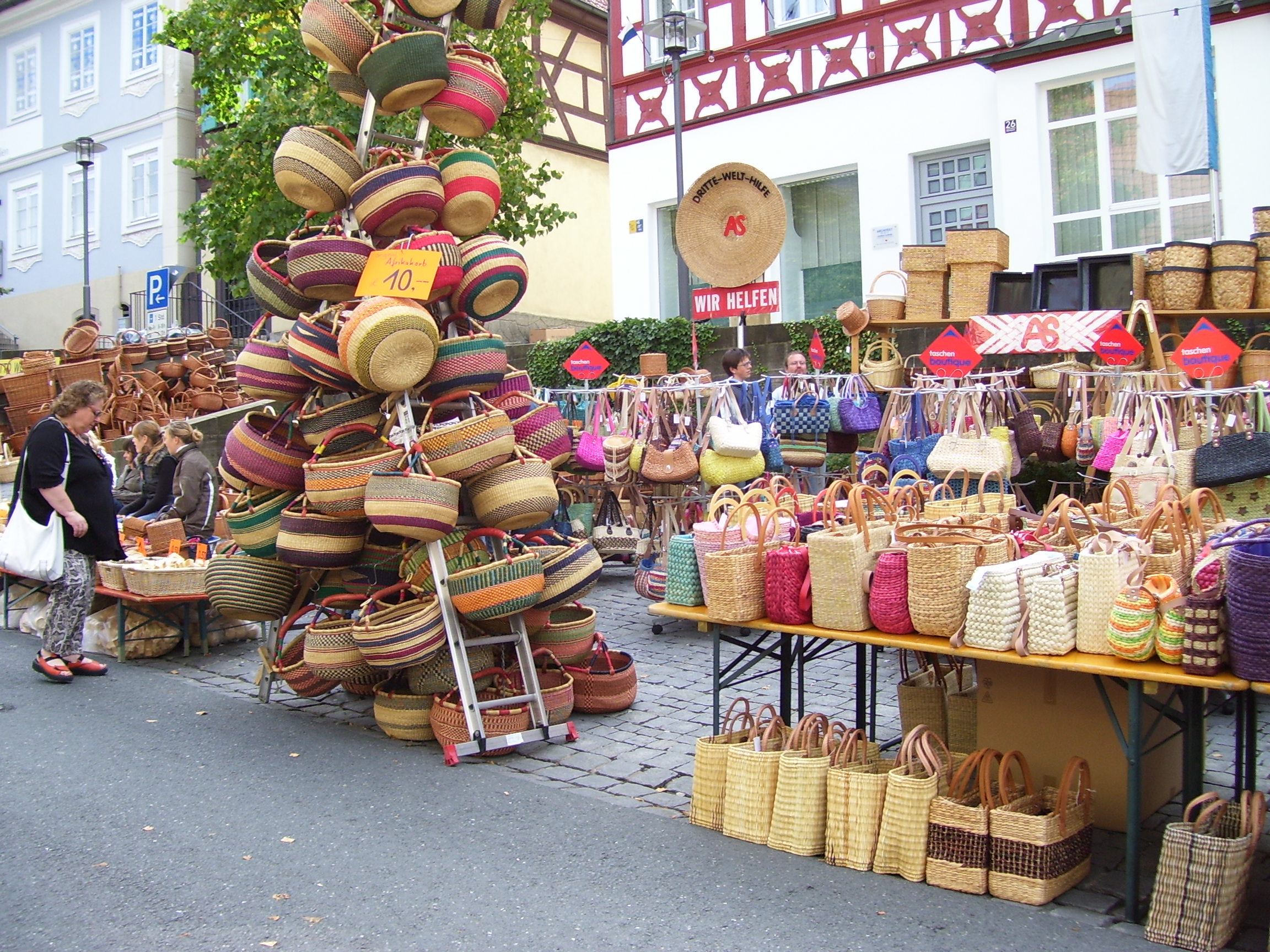
The Korbmarkt

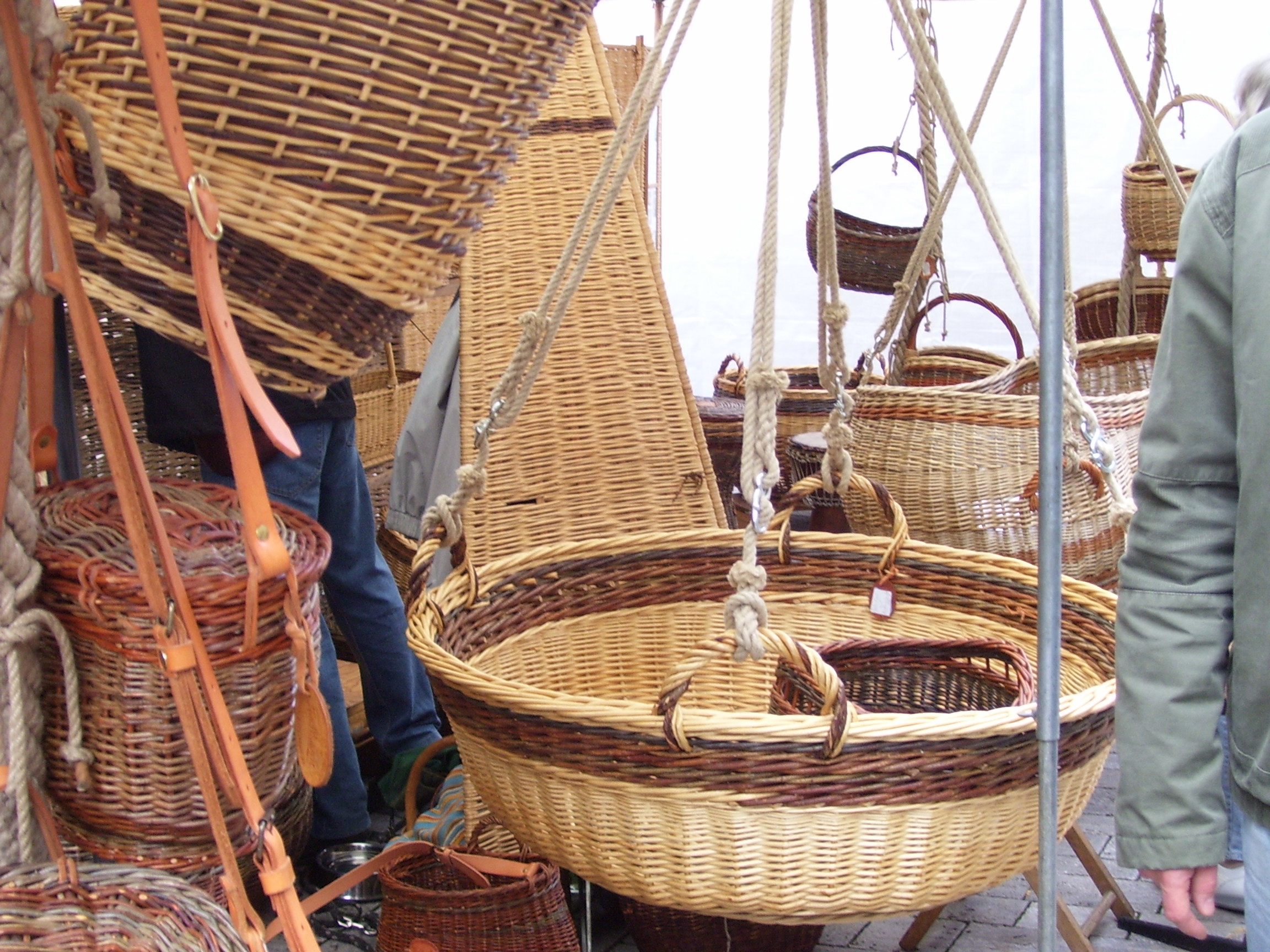
The Korbmarkt

Lichtenfels became a centre of basket making in the middle of the 19th century. The basket makers in the surrounding upper Maintal area brought their products to trade in Lichtenfels, which was and is the biggest retail market. The leading entrepreneur was the basket dealer Joseph Crinkly.

Since 1904, there has been a technical basket college, and as of 1912 there was also a braiding course for women. The fashioned outwork baskets came from the whole family.

After the First World War Lichtenfels became known as the seat of the German wicker or basket-making industry. The period saw the gradual extinction of basket making in Germany. After the Second World War Lichtenfels was the main remaining basket dealer and today as an exclusive exporter of the braiding manufactures.

Lichtenfels is the basket-making capital of Germany and has the only college which still teaches the old craft skills. Each year at the end of September the Korbmarkt (Basket Market) is held when the town is filled with stalls selling baskets from many countries and one can watch many craftspeople at work. On the Market Place in front of the town hall there is the World's largest gift basket.

== Transport ==
=== Road ===
Coburg can be reached by car via B 173 Lichtenfels-Hof-Dresden or motorway A 73 Suhl-Lichtenfels-Nuremberg.

=== Railways ===
Lichtenfels station is on the Eisenach–Lichtenfels and Bamberg-Hof main lines. The Franconian Forest Railway turns off from Bamberg-Hof railway near Lichtenfels. It is a regional rail hub and a former ICE stop.

== Notable people ==
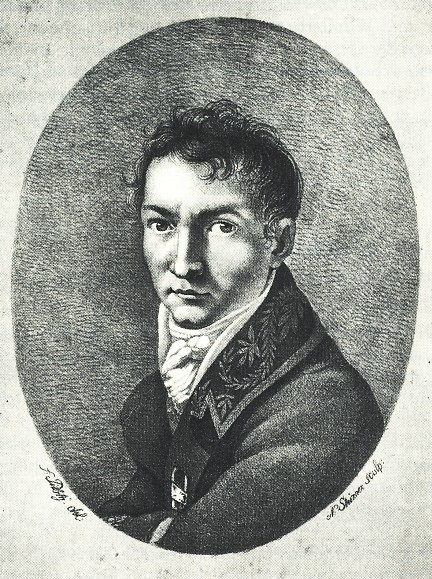
Andreas Röschlaub

- Thomas Dehler (1897–1967), politician (DDP, FDP), Federal Minister of Justice
- Niklas Dorsch (born 1998), footballer
- Heinrich Faber (c. 1490–1552), pedagogue and music theorist
- Reinhard Hütter (born 1958), Christian theologian and professor
- Max Jüngling (1903–1963), politician
- Stefan Kießling (born 1984), footballer
- Friedrich Myconius (1490–1546), reformer
- Andreas Röschlaub (1768–1835), physician and natural philosopher
- Emmi Zeulner (born 1987), politician (CSU)

== Twin towns – sister cities ==
Lichtenfels is twinned with:

- Ariccia, Italy (2004)
- Cournon-d'Auvergne, France (1992)
- Prestwick, Scotland, United Kingdom (1974)
- Vandalia, United States (1975)

== See also ==
- Bärental (Upper Franconia)
