= Heinrich Faber =

German music theorist

Heinrich Faber (before 1500 – 26 February 1552) was a German music theorist, composer, and Kantor.

Born in Lichtenfels, Bavaria, he was employed as a singer by Christian II of Denmark in Copenhagen, from 1515 to 1524. He later studied in Wittenberg, and is known to have lectured there, in 1551. He died in Oelsnitz.

He is known for several theoretical works, and for his beginners' textbook Compendiolum musicae of 1548, which was the most popular book in Lutheran schools during the 16th and 17th centuries, and is today an important source of two-voice compositions of the period.

The Heinrich-Faber Musikschule Lichtenfels – a musical school – is named after him.

== Works ==
- Compendiolum musicae (1548)
- De musica poetica (1548)
- Ad musicam practicam introductio (1550)
