= Richard Yuengling Sr. =

American businessman (1915-1999)

- Born: Richard Yuengling; July 16, 1915; Pottsville, Pennsylvania, US
- Died: March 25, 1999 (aged 83); Pottsville, Pennsylvania, US
- Known for: Owner, Yuengling
- Spouse: Marjorie Hood
- Children: Richard Yuengling Jr. Patricia H. Yuengling
- Parent: Frank D. Yuengling

Richard L. Yuengling Sr. (July 16, 1915 – 1999) was an American businessman, the president and sole owner of the Pottsville, Pennsylvania brewer, Yuengling.

He was born in Pottsville on July 16, 1915. He attended The Hill School

He married Marjorie Hood, the granddaughter of judge and railway magnate Richard H. Koch, and they had a son Richard Yuengling Jr., the present owner and president of Yuengling, and a daughter, Patricia H. Yuengling.
