= Remseck =

Remseck am Neckar
- Town
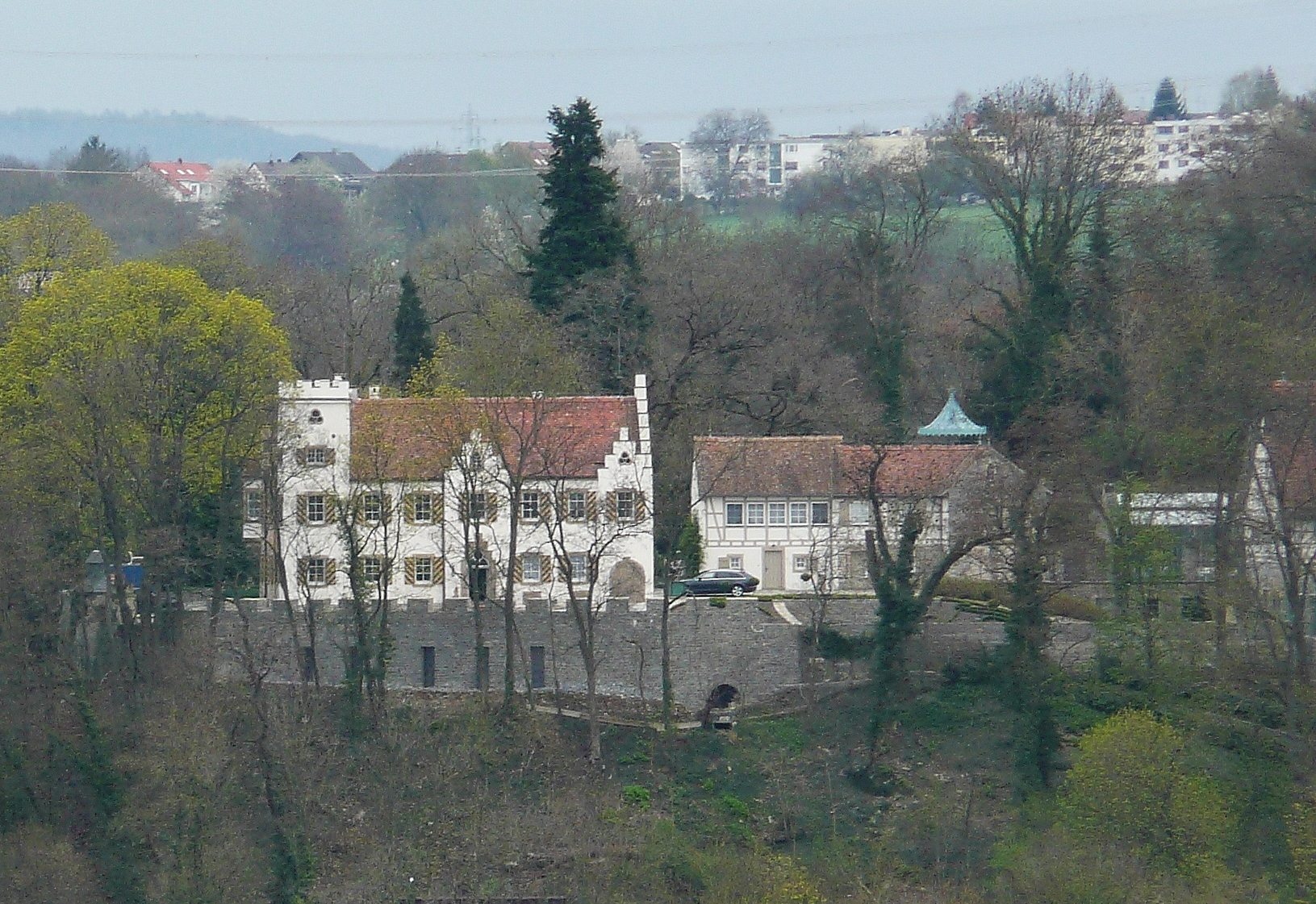
- The neogothic Remseck castle

- Coat of arms

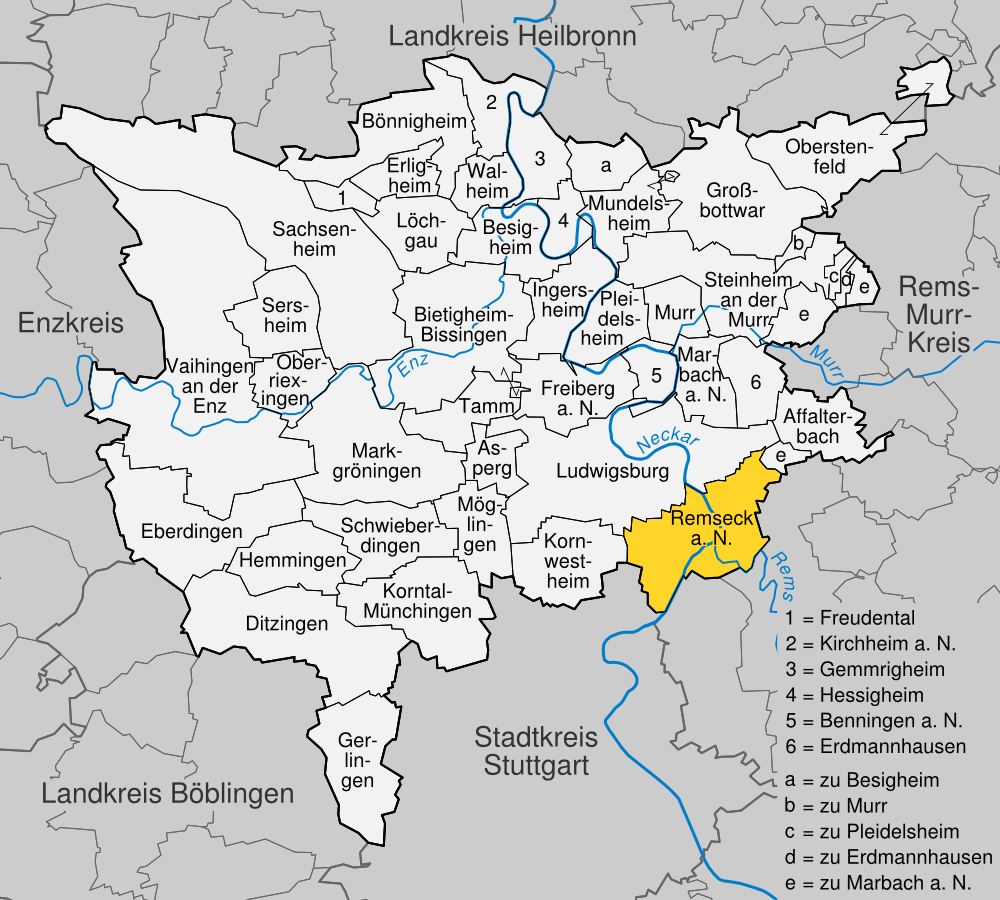
- Location of Remseck am Neckar within Ludwigsburg district
- Interactive map of Remseck am Neckar
- Location within Germany Location within Baden-Württemberg
- Coordinates: 48°52′8″N 9°16′35″E
- Country: Germany
- State: Baden-Württemberg
- Admin. region: Stuttgart
- District: Ludwigsburg
- Subdivisions: 6

Government
  - Mayor (2022–30): Dirk Schönberger (Ind.)

Area
  - Total: 22.82 km^{2} (8.81 sq mi)
- Elevation: 212 m (696 ft)

Population (2025-12-31)
  - Total: 26,089
  - Density: 1,143/km^{2} (2,961/sq mi)
- Time zone: UTC+01:00 (CET)
  - Summer (DST): UTC+02:00 (CEST)
- Postal codes: 71686
- Dialling codes: 07146
- Vehicle registration: LB
- Website: portal.remseck.de

Remseck am Neckar (German pronunciation: [ˈʁɛmsˌʔɛk ʔam ˈnɛkaʁ], lit. 'Remseck on the Neckar') is a swabian town in the district of Ludwigsburg, Baden-Württemberg, Germany. It is situated at the confluence of the rivers Rems and Neckar, about 12 km northeast of Stuttgart, and 7 km southeast of Ludwigsburg. The town was formed on January 1, 1975, initially under the name Aldingen am Neckar. In 1977, it received the name Remseck am Neckar and has had the status of a Große Kreisstadt since January 1, 2004.

== History ==
Before 1975 five of the six boroughs of Remseck used to be independent municipalities. References to Aldingen and Hochdorf can be found as early as 1100, Hochberg is mentioned in a text from 1231 whereas Neckargröningen is already referred to in 806. Neckarrems is also mentioned in 1268 as "Rems"; the "Neckar" was added only in the 17th century.

In Middle Ages Neckarrems and Neckargröningen already belonged to Württemberg. The lordship of Aldingen was held by the Lords of Kaltenthal, while the lordships of Hochberg and Hochdorf were held by the family Nothaft von Hohenberg. In the late 18th century, Aldingen, Hochberg and Hochdorf finally came to Württemberg, too.

Within Württemberg the municipalities of Hochdorf, Hochberg, and Neckarrems used to belong to the district of Waiblingen, whereas Aldingen and Neckargröningen belonged to the district of Ludwigsburg. In 1938 however, all five municipalities were assigned to Ludwigsburg.

Today's Remseck am Neckar was founded on January 1, 1975, by amalgamation of Aldingen, Hochberg, Hochdorf, Neckargröningen and Neckarrems and was initially named "Aldingen am Neckar", but renamed on July 1, 1977. The town's new name "Remseck am Neckar" was chosen due to the castle Remseck, a mediaval fortress that used to be located on a small mountain spur at the confluence of the rivers Rems and Neckar. The original castle was abolished in the 16th century and the ruins used as a quarry. In 1842 a neogothic castle was built at exactly the same place, further verifying the name "Remseck".

In 1955 Pattonville was founded as a United States military housing complex on the area of the former municipality of Aldingen. After the US military left in 1992 it was split in two parts: The eastern part is now a neighborhood of Remseck, the western part belongs to Kornwestheim.

== Government ==
=== District Council ===
Since the last local elections (June 7, 2009), Remseck’s local council has a total of 26 members. 6 members are from the CDU (23,8% in the election), 5 members from the Freie Wähler (20,9%), 5 members from the FDP (18,7%), 5 members from the Die Grünen (18,6%) and 5 members from the SPD (17,9%).

=== Mayor ===
Until 2004, the chairman of the district council was called mayor. When Remseck became a city, the mayor became the “Oberbürgermeister” (head mayor). The Oberbürgermeister is elected directly by the people for eight years and he has two proxies, the “Erster Bürgermeister” (first mayor) and the “Bürgermeister” (mayor).

- Oberbürgermeister: Dirk Schönberger (since 2014)
- Oberbürgermeister: Karl-Heinz Schlumberger (since 1998)
- Erster Bürgermeister: Karl-Heinz Balzer (since 1992)
- Bürgermeister: Reinhard Melchior (since 1996)

== Geography ==
Cadastral districts of Remseck

=== Districts ===
Remseck has six boroughs. Each of the five former municipalities that merged to form Remseck is represented by a cadastral district. Four of the modern boroughs are identical with such a cadastral district. Only the cadastral district of Aldingen contains two boroughs: Aldingen and Pattonville. The boroughs of Remseck are as follows:

- Aldingen (Aldingen am Neckar and the farmstead Sonnenhof)
- Hochberg (Hochberg and Egenhöft)
- Hochdorf (Hochdorf)
- Neckargröningen (Neckargröningen)
- Neckarrems (Neckarrems, the farmstead Remseck and Reningen)
- Pattonville (Eastern part of the settlement Pattonville located within the cadastral district of Aldingen)

=== Neighbouring towns ===
The following towns are neighbouring towns of Remseck, starting north of the city and going clockwise: Ludwigsburg, Marbach am Neckar, Waiblingen, Fellbach, Stuttgart, and Kornwestheim.

== Infrastructure and Media ==
=== Public Transportation ===
==== Rail ====
Since 1999, Remseck is connected to Stuttgart via line U14 (Remseck – Stuttgart Hauptbahnhof – Heslach Vogelrain) of the Stadtbahn, which is a part of the Verkehrs- und Tarifverbund Stuttgart. There are four stops on Remseck territory.Since 2017, the line U12 connects Remseck to Stuttgart.

==== Bus ====
There are four bus lines (402, 403, 404, and 405) operating just in Remseck plus several lines connecting Remseck with Ludwigsburg, Waiblingen and other nearby cities. At weekends, the night-time bus N43 also stops in Remseck.

=== Media ===
Several media, including the Ludwigsburger Kreiszeitung and the Stuttgarter Zeitung, report on events in Remseck. The local weekly newspaper Remseck Woche is released every Thursday and the Pattonville Info every other week.

== Culture and contemporary life ==
=== Museums ===
The “Radiomuseum” in Aldingen displays radios from 1924 to today. The “Heimatstube”, located in Nekarrems, presents peasant life in the region, including a shoemaker’s workshop. In the “Dorfschmiede” in Neckargröningen, visitors can try forging in the blacksmith’s shop.

=== Tourism ===
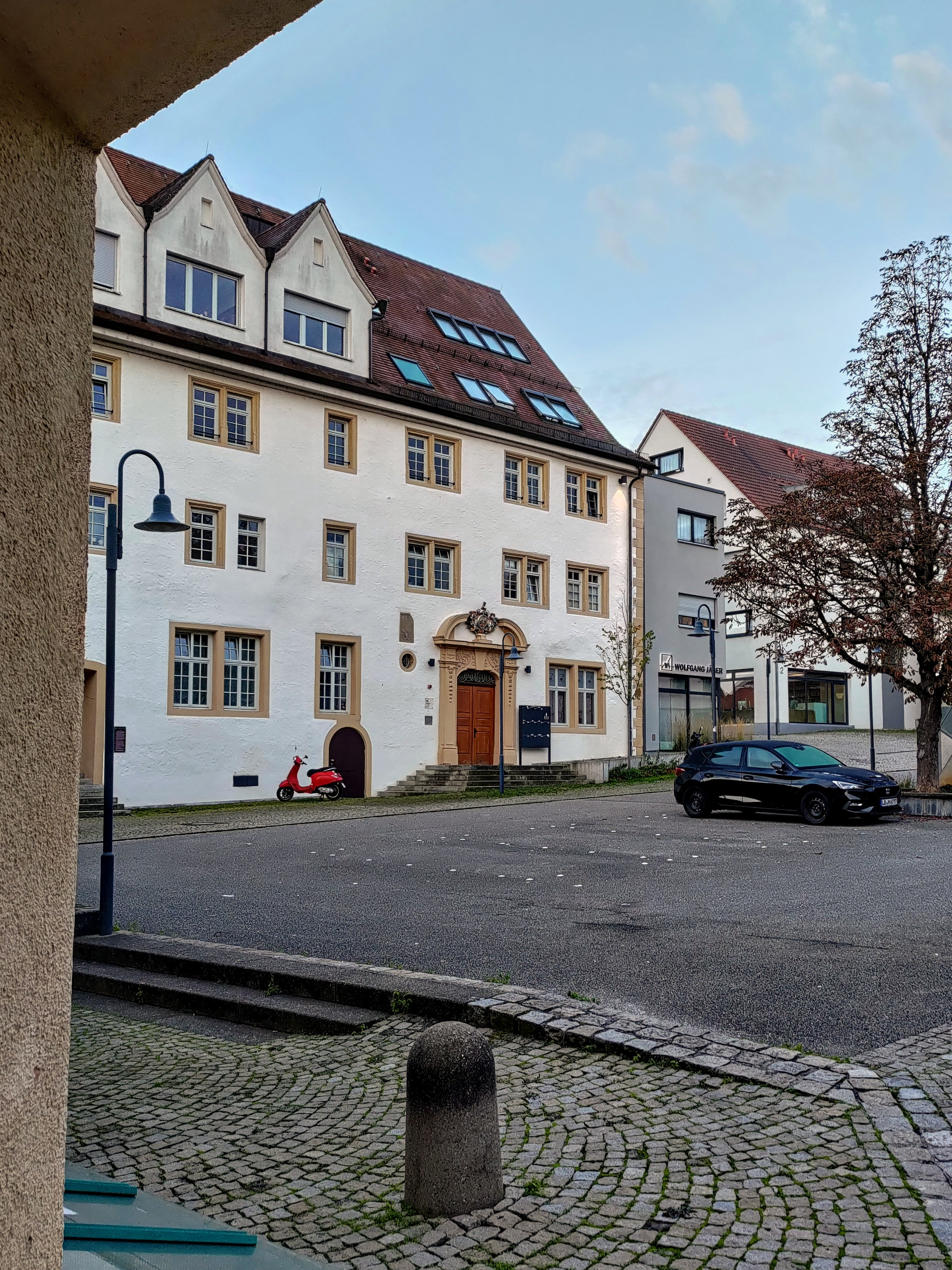
Courtyard of the renaissance castle in the borough of Aldingen

- Aldingen has a castle from the Renaissance (1580), which has an entrance in baroque style and a Gothic church (“Margaretenkirche”), built in 1398, which is still the Protestant church of Aldingen and has several gravestones from the 16th and 17th century.
- Hochberg also has a castle, built in 1593, with a great hall, a neo-Gothic, Protestant church (built in 1854) and a former wine press house (built in 1752), which is now a festival hall. There is also a Jewish cemetery from the 19th century.
- Hochdorf’s castle from the 16th century has been remodelled in 1612, but some parts of the walls are still there. Hochdorf also has a Gothic church named St. Wendelin and an ancient dairy-farm from the 16th century.
- Neckargröningen has several houses with a timber frame construction, an old town hall (built in 1592) and a former fortified church (St. Martin), which has a Gothic chancel originating in 1515 and wall paintings from the Late Middle Ages
- Neckarrems’ old town hall (built in 1564) features timber frame construction from 1915. The late Gothic church St. Michael and Sebastian was built around 1500, the “Castle Remseck” was built in 1842 on a mountain, where you can also find remains of a castle from the Middle Ages.
- Two bridges for pedestrians and cyclist were built in 1988 and 1990 and were the biggest self-supporting, wooden bridges in Europe at this time. The bridge over the Neckar is 80m long and the bridge over the Rems is 51,2m long.

=== Festivals and regular events ===
- Pentecost: Music festival at the Zipfelbach (Hochdorf)
- July: Wilhelmsfestplatz in Hochdorf (every other year); Summer festival with fireworks in Hochberg; Street fair in Neckarrems
- July/August: Soccer cup “Neckar-Rems Pokal”
- October: traditional “Oktoberfest“ in Hochberg
- December: Christmas market on a Sunday in Advent

=== Sport ===
All six boroughs have their own sports clubs: TV Aldingen, TSV Neckargröningen, VfB Neckarrems, SGV Hochdorf, SKV Hochberg, and SV Pattonville.

== Demographics ==
As of December 31, 2008, the population of Remseck is 22,612, of which 11,086 are male and 11,526 are female. 2,676 resident aliens are living in Remseck. The population spreads out with 20.6% under the age of 18 and 15.9% older than 65 years.

== Education ==
Remseck has one Gymnasium (Lise-Meitner-Gymnasium), located in Aldingen, one Realschule (Realschule Remseck), located in Pattonville and one Hauptschule (Wilhelm-Keil-Schule), located in Aldingen. Every borough has its own elementary school. There are also 15 kindergarten, including three Protestant, one Roman-Catholic and one ecumenical kindergarten.

== International relations ==
Remseck is twinned with three cities.

- Meslay-du-Maine, France, since 1974 (originally twinned with the former municipality of Aldingen, the partnership was extended on present-day Remseck in 1975)
- Vigo di Fassa, Italy, since 1997
- Codlea, Romania, since 2016

== Notable people ==
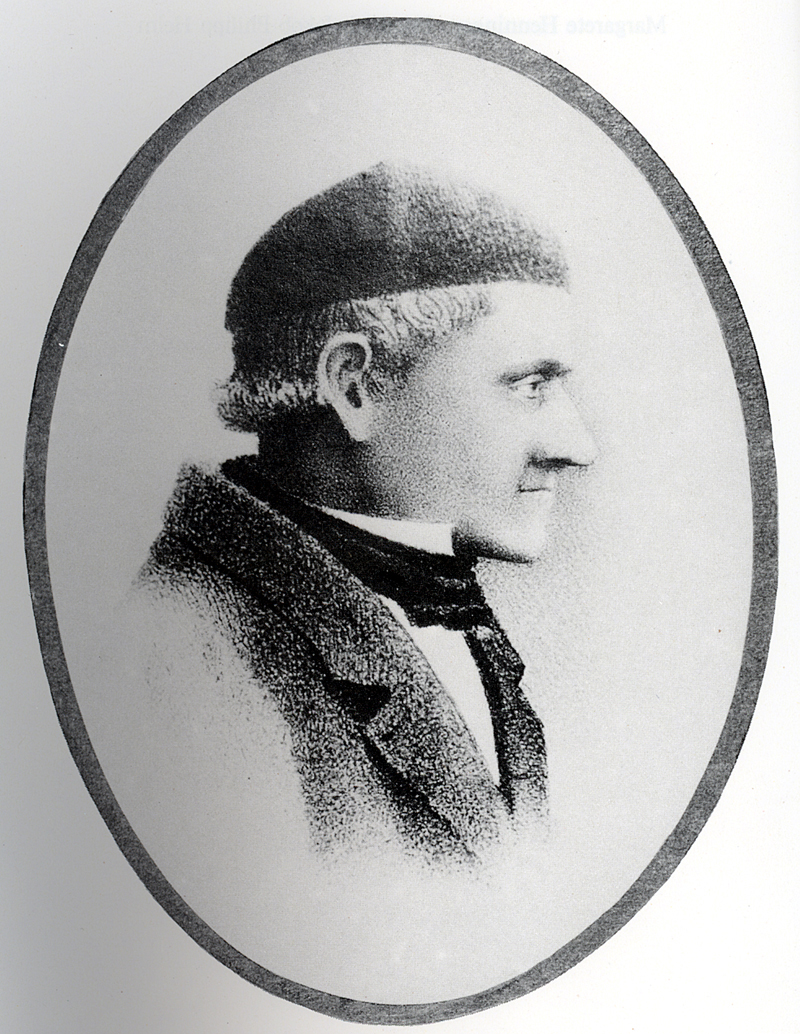
Friedrich Heim

- Friedrich Heim (1789–1850), born in Hochdorf, Protestant pastor and founder of the still existing Paulinepflege Winnenden
- Ludvig Holstein-Ledreborg (1839–1912), Danish politician, in 1909 Prime Minister
- Ulrich Kienzle (1936–2020), journalist and Middle East expert, an employee at the ZDF and 3sat, known by the ZDF political broadcast Frontal, born in Neckargröningen, grew up in Neckarrems
- Fabio Leutenecker (born 1990), football player
- David Yuengling (1808–1877), American brewer, the founder of America's oldest brewery, D. G. Yuengling & Son, born in Aldingen
- Leonie Maier (born 1992), football player and Olympic gold medalist, grown up in Remseck and starting her career at TV Aldingen
