= Frederick Yuengling =

American businessman (1848-1899)

Frederick G. Yuengling
- Born: January 26, 1848; Pottsville, Pennsylvania, U.S.
- Died: January 2, 1899 (aged 50); Pottsville, Pennsylvania, U.S.
- Citizenship: United States
- Education: Pennsylvania State College; Manhattan Business School
- Known for: D. G. Yuengling & Son second president
- Spouse: Minna Dohrman Yuengling
- Children: 2, including Frank D. Yuengling
- Father: David Yuengling

Frederick Yuengling (/ˈjɪŋlɪŋ/ YING-ling) (January 26, 1848 – January 2, 1899) was an American businessman and the second president and owner of America's oldest brewery, D. G. Yuengling & Son.

== Personal life ==
Frederick Yuengling was born to David Yuengling and Elizabeth (née Betz) Yuengling on January 26, 1848. He attended Pennsylvania State College and then the Manhattan Business School in Poughkeepsie, New York. In 1871, his father sent him to Europe to learn more about brewing, where he studied in Munich, Stuttgart and Vienna.

Yuengling married Minna Dohrman of Brooklyn, New York, on April 3, 1873. Minna was from the "uppermost social class" in New York and enjoyed the mannered social scene in Pennsylvania. The newlyweds purchased a townhouse on Mahantongo Street, a street known for its "opulence" at the time. The house had six bedrooms, formal living rooms, formal dining rooms, a music room, tiled entryways, a Spanish crystal chandelier and German stained-glass windows. On one occasion, Yuengling took a group of friends to Europe on a grand tour and then back to New York City without allowing them "to spend a cent". On the top floor of the Yuengling brewery there was a famous room where Yuengling entertained his friends on a lavish scale. Yuengling and his wife had two children. Frank D. Yuengling was born September 27, 1876. Daughter Edith Louise Yuengling followed on March 18, 1878; she died on October 6, 1883, at 5 years old. This left son Frank as the sole heir of his parents.

On January 3, 1899, the New York Times announced that Yuengling had died of pneumonia the day previously. Yuengling was almost aged 51 at the time of his death. The New York Times had routinely covered Yuengling during his life.

== Business ==
In 1873, Yuengling joined his father at the brewery, where the business name was changed from D.G. Yuengling to D.G. Yuengling & Son.

Yuengling was vice president of the Schuylkill Electric Railway Company, which started 1889. He also served as the president of the Pottsville Gas Company, a position that his father had held as well. He was also director of the Pottsville Water Company and of the safety deposit box, both positions that had previously belonged to his father.
