= Frederick Juengling =

American painter

Frederick Juengling (born Friedrich Jüngling, 8 October 1846 – 31 December 1889) was an American wood engraver and painter.

== Biography ==
Juengling was born in Leipzig, Germany. He obtained a common school education until the age of 14 in Leipzig. Juengling then worked as an apprentice to an engraver in Berlin before emigrating to the United States in 1866.

He studied painting at the Art Students' League in New York City, adopted art as a profession, and attained much recognition as a wood engraver. He was a founder of the American Society of Wood Engravers, its first secretary 1881–1882, and was vice-president of the Art Students' League 1882–1883. He received honorable mention at the Paris Salon in 1881, and a second-class medal at an international exhibition of fine arts held in Munich in 1883. He taught engravers in his own studio.

Juengling was identified with what was known as the new school in wood engraving. This American system of wood engraving substituted short, broken lines and dot stippling and so forth for the regulation long lines and regular sweep of the metal engraver. Sylvester Koehler, in his paper on the United States contributed to the folio volume Die Radierung der Gegenwart ("Current engraving," Vienna, 1892–93), calls him the "boldest and most inconsiderate experimenter among the pioneers of the new school," but cites his reproduction of "Monticello" as a veritable triumph of wood engraving. Juengling's reproductions of Kelly's illustrations in Scribner's Monthly (1877) is regarded by Weitenkampf as making "the first obvious, continued assertion of the new point of view."

Juengling died in New York City, survived by his wife, Helen Juengling. A celebration of his life and work, and auction of his works and studio effects was held shortly after his decease at the Salmagundi Club.

== Works ==
=== Engravings ===
- The Professor, engraved after Frank Duveneck
- The Voice of the Sea, after Arthur Quartley
- "In the Land of Promise," after Chas. F. Ulrich, A.N.A. 1886

=== Paintings ===
- The Intruder (1884)
- Westward Bound (1884)
- In the Street (1886)
