= Max Jüngling =

German politician (1903–1963)

Max Jüngling (7 May 1903 in Lichtenfels – 14 February 1963) was a German politician. From 1946-1963 he was Landrat in the District of Lichtenfels, and from 1951 to 1963 he was a member of the Bavarian Parliament.

== Politics ==
As well as being Lichtenfels' Landrat from 1946 until his death, Jüngling was also a member of the Christian Social Union of Bavaria as a member of the Bavarian Parliament starting in 1951.

In 1927, Jüngling wrote Catholic Church offices under applicable Bavarian State Church Law; (The construction, alteration, suspension and instrumentation), which is held in the Bavarian Library Network in Germany.
