= Frank D. Yuengling =

American businessman (1876-1963)

- Born: September 27, 1876; Pottsville, Pennsylvania, US
- Died: January 29, 1963 (aged 86); Pottsville, Pennsylvania, US
- Education: Princeton University
- Known for: Owner, Yuengling
- Children: Richard Yuengling Sr.
- Parent: Frederick Yuengling

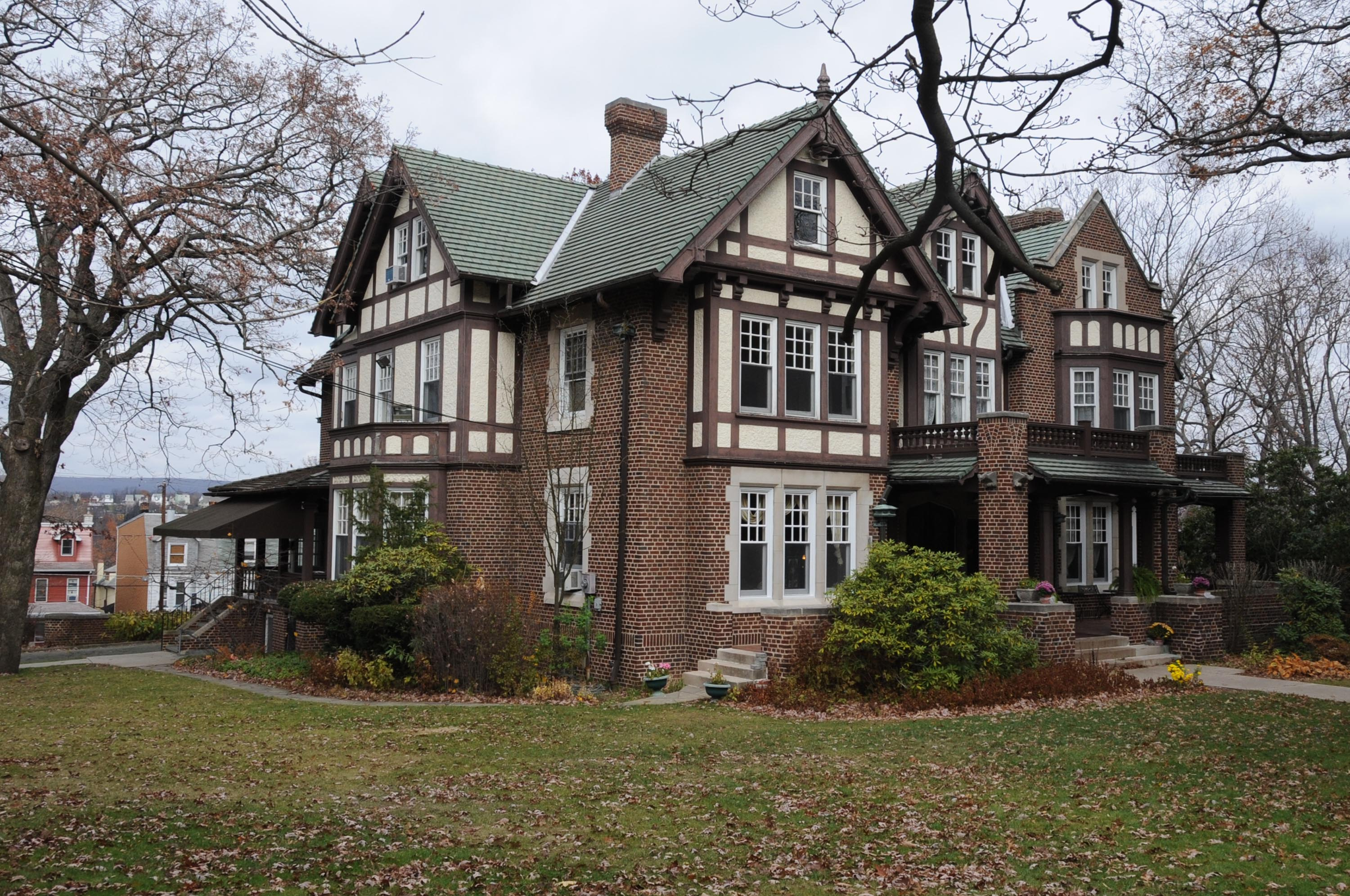
Frank D. Yuengling Mansion, Pottsville

Frank D. Yuengling (September 27, 1876 – January 29, 1963) was an American businessman, the president and owner of the Pottsville, Pennsylvania brewer, Yuengling.

== Early life ==
Frank D. Yuengling was born on September 27, 1876, the son of Frederick Yuengling and his wife Minna, and was educated at Princeton University.

== Career ==
Following his father's death in 1899, he took over the running of the brewery, borrowed $500,000, and slowly bought out the other family members, with he and his mother living on $50 a month until the debt was repaid. He ran the company until his death in 1963.

== Personal life ==
In 1913, he had a large three-storey home built in Pottsville, now known as the Frank D. Yuengling Mansion.

He had a son Richard Yuengling Sr., who became owner and president of Yuengling.

He is buried at the Charles Baber Cemetery in Pottsville.
