= Richard Yuengling Jr. =

American businessman (born 1943)

- Born: Richard Yuengling; March 10, 1943 (age 83); Pottsville, Pennsylvania, US
- Education: Lycoming College (dropped out)
- Known for: Owner, Yuengling
- Spouse: Divorced
- Children: 4 daughters
- Parent: Richard Yuengling Sr.
- Relatives: Frank D. Yuengling (grandfather)

Richard Lee Yuengling Jr. (born 1943) is an American billionaire businessman and the president and sole owner of the Pottsville, Pennsylvania brewer, Yuengling. He is the fifth generation of the family to run Yuengling, and owns 100% of the company, having bought out his father in 1985.

== Career ==
He started work at Yuengling in 1958, while still in high school.

In 1973, he left because he couldn't get his father to invest and expand. He bought a wholesale beer distributor business, working with Pabst Blue Ribbon and Rolling Rock, and stayed there for 11 years.

He is the fifth generation of the family to run Yuengling, and owns 100% of the company, having bought out his father in 1985. In the 2016 edition of the Forbes 400, Dick Yuengling was ranked 361 with a net worth of $1.9 billion.

== Personal life ==
He is divorced, with four daughters, and lives in Pottsville, Pennsylvania. All four of his daughters work for Yuengling.

Yuengling supported Donald Trump in the 2016 Presidential Election.
