= David Yuengling =

American businessman and brewer

David Gottlieb Yuengling
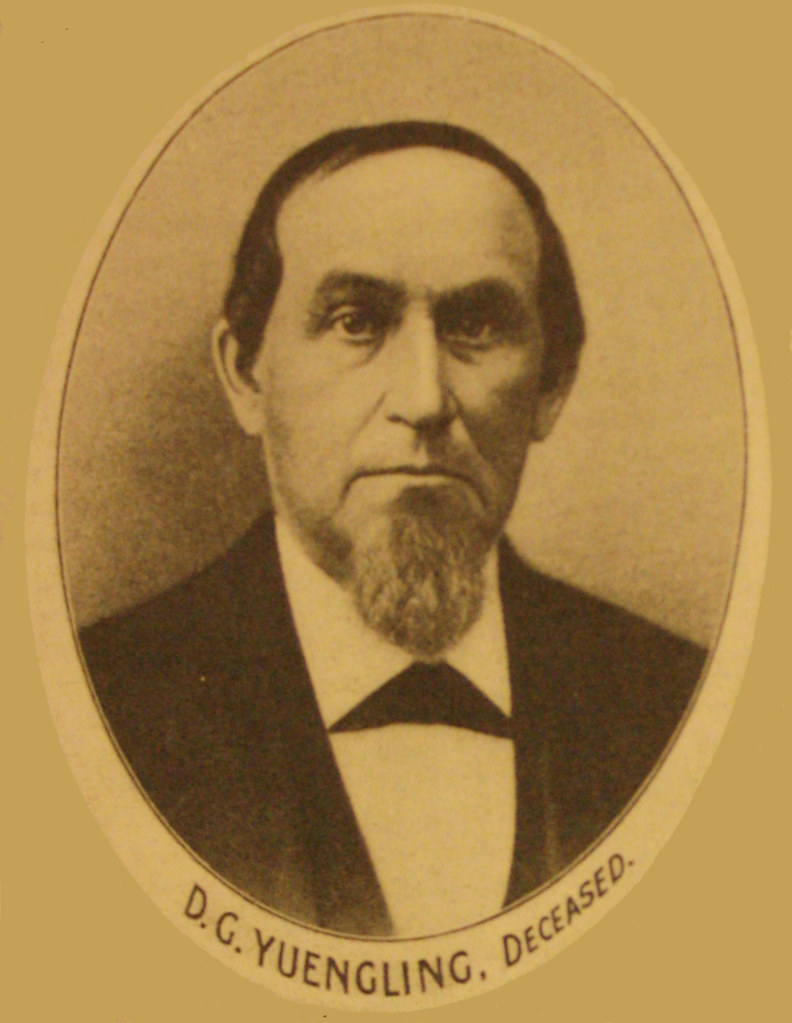
- Born: David Gottlob Jüngling; March 2, 1808; Aldingen, Kingdom of Württemberg (now Germany)
- Died: September 27, 1877 (aged 69); Pottsville, Pennsylvania, US
- Known for: Founder, Yuengling
- Children: Frederick Yuengling; David G. Yuengling Jr.
- Parent(s): Friedrich Jüngling; Anna Maria Jüngling

David Gottlieb Yuengling (March 2, 1808 – September 27, 1877) was an American businessman and brewer, the founder and first president of America's oldest brewery, D. G. Yuengling & Son.

== Early life ==
He was born David Gottlob Jüngling on March 2, 1808, in Aldingen near Stuttgart in the Kingdom of Württemberg, where his father operated the local brewery. His older brother Jakob inherited the family brewery, leaving Yuengling with limited career prospects. He immigrated to the United States via Rotterdam.

== Career ==
Yuengling came to Pottsville, Pennsylvania, the location of a thriving anthracite mine, and started a brewery in 1829, calling it the Eagle Brewery. Yuengling brewed British-style ales initially, and later introduced German-style lager.

His son David G. Yuengling Jr. founded the James River Steam Brewery.
