= Yuengling =

Brewery based in Pottsville, Pennsylvania

D.G. Yuengling & Son, Inc.

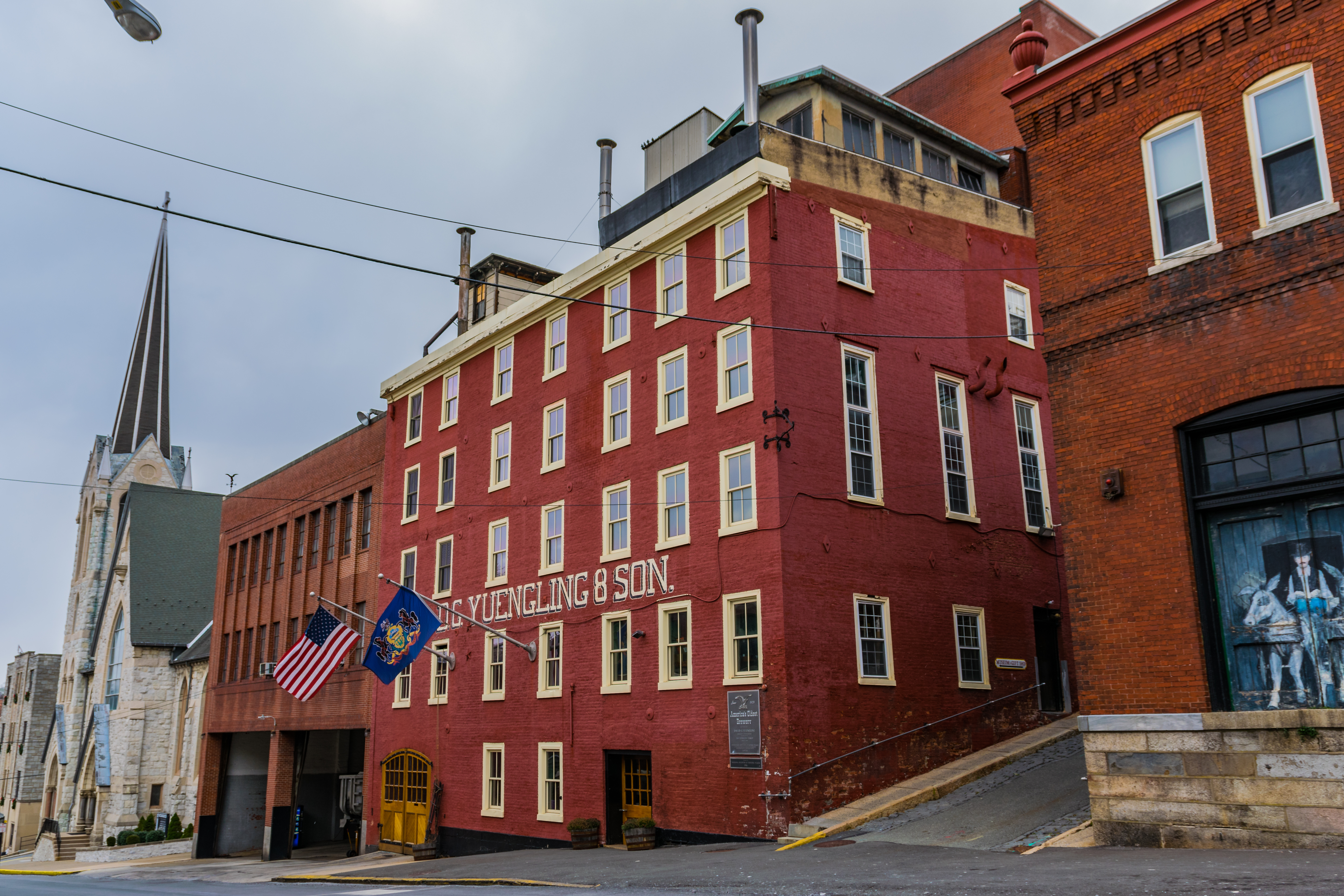
- The Yuengling brewing complex in Pottsville, Pennsylvania
- Formerly: Eagle Brewery
- Type: Private
- Industry: Brewing
- Founded: 1829; 197 years ago
- Founder: David Yuengling
- Headquarters: Pottsville, Pennsylvania, United States
- Area served: East Coast, Southern, and Midwestern United States
- Production output: 2.9 million US beer barrels (3,400,000 hL) in 2015
- Owner: Richard Yuengling Jr.
- Website: yuengling.com

D.G. Yuengling & Son, Inc. (/ˈjɪŋ.lɪŋ/ YING-ling) is an American brewing company based in Pottsville, Pennsylvania. Established in 1829, it is the oldest operating brewing company in the United States. In 2025, the Brewers Association ranked Yuengling as the largest craft brewing company and the seventh-largest brewing company overall in the United States by beer sales volume. The company operates three breweries: its historic Pottsville brewery, the nearby Mill Creek brewery, and a brewery in Tampa, Florida.

The company's name, Yuengling, is an Anglicized version of Jüngling, its founder's surname and the German word for youngling. The family-owned brewery has traditionally changed ownership through the purchase of the company by the children of the previous owner. Richard L. "Dick" Yuengling Jr., the fifth generation of the family to head the business, owns the brewery; all four of his daughters work for the company as its sixth generation.

Yuengling Traditional Lager, an amber lager reintroduced in 1987, is the company's flagship product. It is popular enough in Pennsylvania and the Philadelphia metropolitan area to be ordered in some bars by simply asking for a lager. In 2020, D.G. Yuengling & Son and Molson Coors Beverage Company formed The Yuengling Company, a separate 50–50 joint venture for expansion beyond much of the brewery's established eastern distribution territory. Even so, D.G. Yuengling & Son itself remained independently owned by the Yuengling family. By 2026, Yuengling beer was distributed in 30 states.

During Prohibition, members of the Yuengling family also established a separate dairy and ice cream company. The dairy continued until 1985, and the Yuengling's Ice Cream brand was revived in 2014 by another branch of the family. The revived ice cream company is not affiliated with D.G. Yuengling & Son.

== History ==
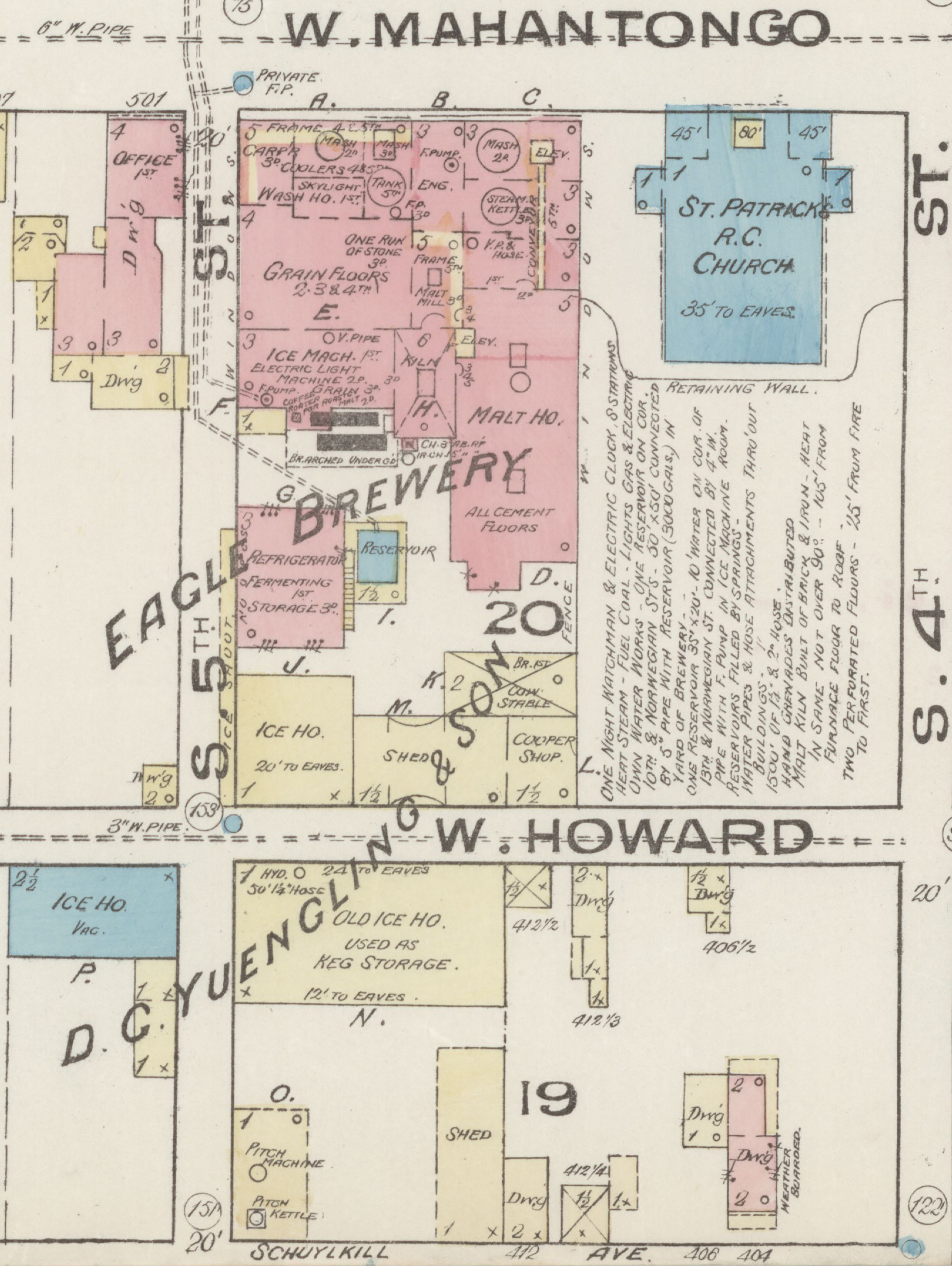
D. G. Yuengling & Son Eagle Brewery in the June 1885 Sanborn map

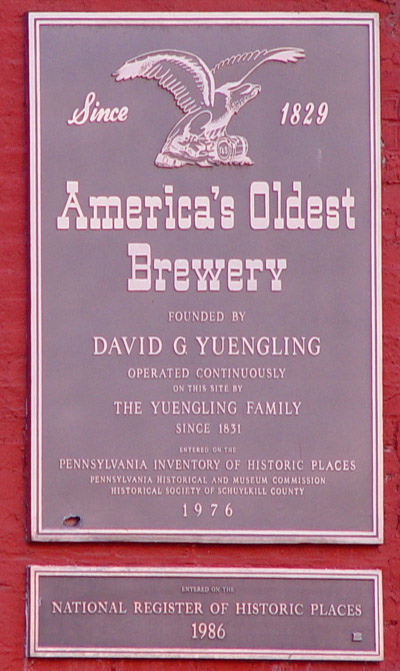
Plaque on the outside of the brewery

=== Founding and early generations ===
German brewer David Gottlieb Jüngling (1808–1877) immigrated to the United States in 1828 from Aldingen, near Stuttgart, in the Kingdom of Württemberg. He anglicized his surname from Jüngling to Yuengling and began the Eagle Brewery on Centre Street in Pottsville in 1829. The first brewery burned down in an 1831 fire, and the company relocated to West Mahantongo Street at Fifth Street, its current location.

Yuengling's eldest son David Jr. left the Eagle Brewery to establish the James River Steam Brewery along the James River in Richmond, Virginia. In 1873, another son, Frederick Yuengling, joined his father in running the Pottsville brewery, which was renamed D.G. Yuengling & Son. Although the company's name changed, the bald eagle remained its emblem. During the late 19th century, members of the family also opened breweries in Saratoga Springs, New York, New York City, and Trail, British Columbia. These operations were eventually merged with the Pottsville plant.

Frank D. Yuengling began heading the company in 1899 after the death of his father Frederick.

=== Prohibition and mid-20th century ===
During Prohibition, Yuengling survived by producing "near beers", beverages with an alcohol content of 0.5 percent, under the names Yuengling Special, Yuengling Por-Tor, and Yuengling Juvo. The family also opened dance halls in Philadelphia, Baltimore, and New York City.

In 1920, Frank D. Yuengling established Yuengling's Ice Cream as a separate company to provide another source of revenue for the family. Its plant was constructed directly opposite the brewery in Pottsville. The business later began processing and distributing milk and was renamed Yuengling Dairy Products Corporation in 1930.

When Prohibition was repealed in 1933, the brewery introduced Winner Beer in celebration and sent a truckload of beer to the White House for President Franklin D. Roosevelt. In 1935, full ownership of Yuengling Dairy Products was transferred to Frederick G. Yuengling Sr., while Frank returned to managing the brewery full-time. The dairy thereafter remained a separately owned Yuengling family business.

Richard L. Yuengling Sr. and F. Dohrman Yuengling succeeded Frank Yuengling after their father's death in 1963. The dairy passed in the same year to Frederick G. "Fritz" Yuengling Jr.

The brewery experienced an increase in sales amid renewed interest in American history surrounding the United States Bicentennial in 1976. After the nearby Mount Carbon Brewery ceased operations, Yuengling acquired the rights to its Bavarian Premium Beer name and label. Yuengling continued producing the brand for a time after Mount Carbon closed.

Yuengling Dairy Products ceased production in 1985 when no member of the succeeding generation took over the business.

=== Expansion under Richard Yuengling Jr. ===
Richard L. "Dick" Yuengling Jr. took over as the fifth-generation head of D.G. Yuengling & Son in 1985. The same year, the Pottsville brewing complex was listed on the National Register of Historic Places.

In 1987, the brewery reintroduced an amber lager it had not produced in decades. Traditional Lager became the company's flagship brand, eventually accounting for approximately 80 percent of its production and contributing substantially to the company's subsequent growth. In 1990, the brewery sold 138,000 barrels; at the time, Yuengling was the largest brewer of porter in the United States.

Demand in the Philadelphia metropolitan area, Pennsylvania, New Jersey, and Delaware grew beyond the capacity of the historic brewery during the 1990s. The company registered the Yuengling trademark in 1995. In 1998, Dick Yuengling announced plans for a new brewery at Mill Creek near Pottsville. The following year, the company increased its manufacturing capacity by purchasing a former Stroh Brewery Company plant in Tampa, Florida, retaining former Stroh employees and working with a trade union for the first time. The Mill Creek brewery, in Port Carbon near Pottsville, was completed in 2001, giving Yuengling three operating breweries.

Yuengling employees filed for union decertification in 2006. The company consequently did not renew its contract with Teamsters Local 830 of Philadelphia in March of that year. The Teamsters subsequently began a boycott of Yuengling products.

As the company's production capacity increased, Yuengling gradually expanded beyond its longstanding Mid-Atlantic markets. Distribution began in Georgia in late October 2008 and in West Virginia in May 2009. The company entered Ohio in October 2011.

A fire broke out at the Tampa brewery on October 26, 2013; contemporary reports did not establish the extent of the damage.

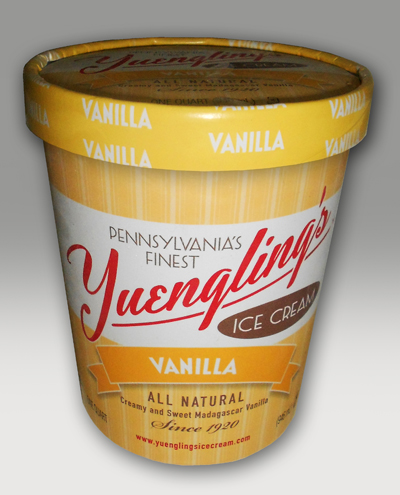
A quart of Yuengling vanilla ice cream

In February 2014, Yuengling's Ice Cream returned to the market after a nearly 30-year absence. The revived business was headed by David Yuengling, a cousin of Dick Yuengling and a descendant of David Gottlieb Yuengling, but was a separate company with no corporate connection to the brewery. Yuengling beer also returned to Massachusetts on March 3, 2014, after beginning to appear in some bars and restaurants the previous month. Distribution expanded to Rhode Island in June 2014 and Connecticut that September, followed by Louisiana in August 2016 and Indiana in March 2017.

By 2015, Yuengling was producing approximately 2.9 million US beer barrels (3,400,000 hL) annually at its three breweries.

In June 2016, as part of a consent decree, Yuengling agreed to spend approximately $7 million to upgrade water-treatment facilities and to pay $2.8 million in penalties to settle Clean Water Act violations at its two Pennsylvania breweries between 2008 and 2015. In October 2016, Dick Yuengling's endorsement of Donald Trump for president prompted calls for boycotts of Yuengling products.

In a 2016 interview, Dick Yuengling said he intended eventually to transfer at least 51 percent control of the company to either Jennifer or Wendy Yuengling, both then company executives, but declined to identify publicly which daughter he had selected. By 2019, his other two daughters, Debbie and Sheryl, also worked for the brewery and were described as part of the generation expected to succeed him.

Yuengling announced in December 2017 that it would begin distributing in Arkansas in January 2018. The announcement followed a social-media promotion in which the company suggested that its next market would be Arkansas, Kentucky, Michigan, or Texas. Kentucky began serving Yuengling on draft on March 6, 2018, with packaged sales beginning later that month.

In October 2019, Yuengling partnered with The Hershey Company on the limited-release Yuengling Hershey's Chocolate Porter, the first collaborative beer in the brewery's 190-year history.

=== Joint venture and further expansion ===
In September 2020, D.G. Yuengling & Son and Molson Coors Beverage Company established The Yuengling Company LLC, a 50–50 joint venture intended to expand Yuengling distribution beyond most of the brewery's existing 22-state territory. The joint venture was organized as a separate business entity with equal representation from Yuengling and Molson Coors on its board. D.G. Yuengling & Son continued to operate separately as an independently owned Yuengling family company.

Texas became the joint venture's first new market in August 2021, with beer for the Texas market brewed at Molson Coors' facility in Fort Worth, Texas. Distribution through the joint venture expanded to Kansas, Missouri, and Oklahoma in 2023.

Yuengling entered Illinois and Michigan in 2025. Michigan had been one of the states considered for expansion in 2017 but had not received distribution at that time. Distribution expanded to Iowa and Wisconsin in 2026, bringing Yuengling's distribution footprint to 30 states.

== Products ==
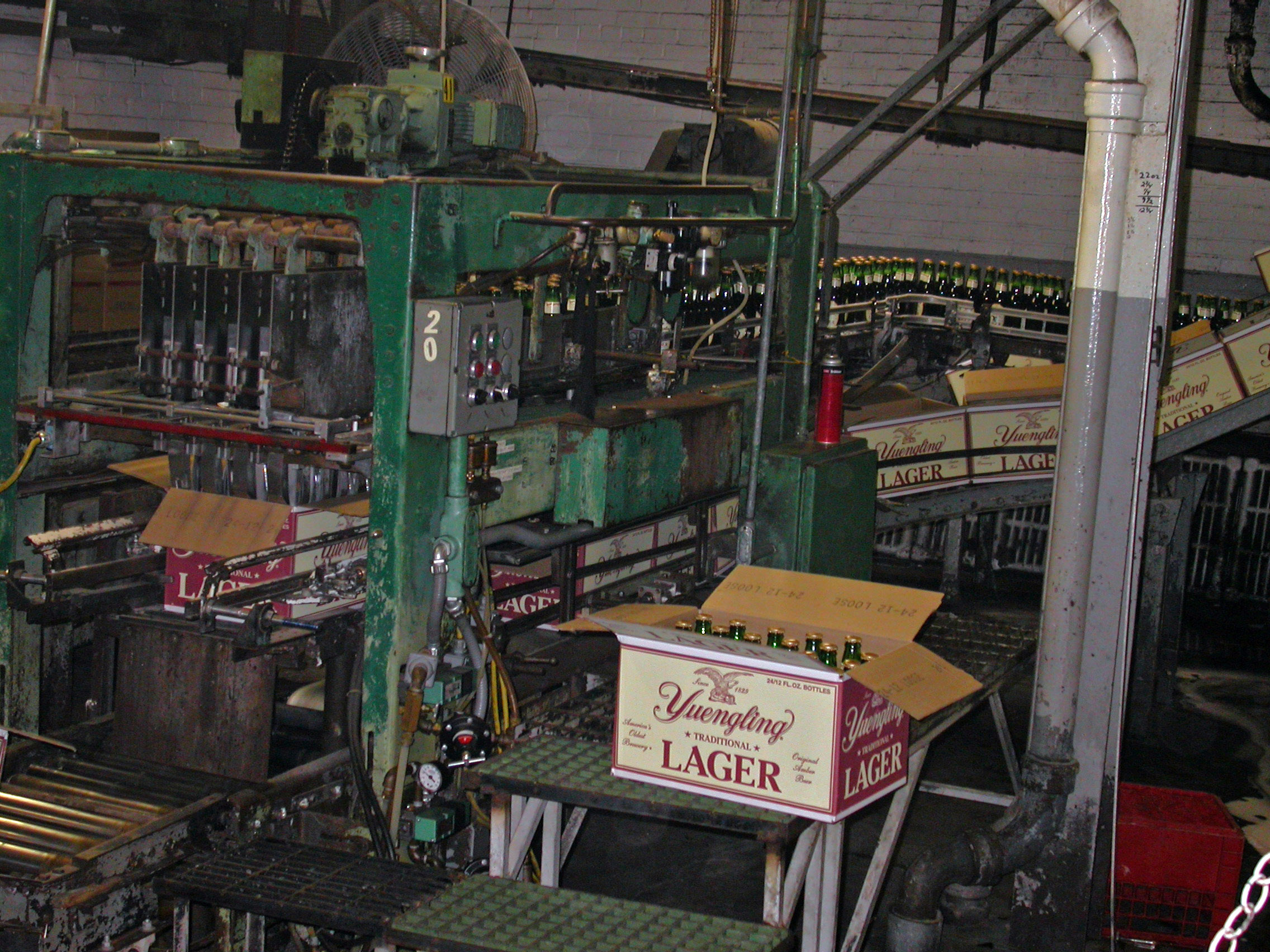
Finished bottles being cased at a brewery

- Traditional Lager

An amber lager in the style common before Prohibition, commonly called a pre-Prohibition lager. Reintroduced in 1987, it was brought back to market by longtime Yuengling brewmaster N. Ray Norbert. It subsequently became the company's flagship beer and is what is served when a "lager" is ordered in many parts of Pennsylvania, New Jersey, and Delaware. It is usually sold in green bottles prominently featuring the word "LAGER" on the label, but is also available in cans, brown quart bottles, and 24-ounce cans. It was previously offered in 22-ounce bottles, colloquially known as "bombers" but the term "cannon" has since replaced "bomber" for the large cans. Yuengling Lager is 4.5 percent ABV.

- Light Lager

A lower-calorie version of Traditional Lager.

- Yuengling Premium Beer

A standard American pilsner. It was Yuengling's flagship brand before the introduction of Traditional Lager. As of 2020, its distribution was primarily limited to Pennsylvania and Florida.

- Yuengling Premium Light Beer

A lower-calorie version of Yuengling Premium Beer.

- Original Black & Tan

A black and tan consisting of 40 percent Yuengling Premium Beer and 60 percent Dark-Brewed Porter. It was introduced in 1986.

- Dark-Brewed Porter

A Baltic porter with a very dark, nearly black color, a pale tan head, and a strong malt flavor. Porter originated in England in the early 18th century and became popular in colonial America, with production concentrated in Pennsylvania. When German brewers such as D.G. Yuengling began brewing in the United States, the popularity of porter led them to add the style to their offerings. By the beginning of the craft brewing revival in the 1970s, British breweries had largely ceased producing porter, while Yuengling, Stegmaier, and Narragansett were among the few American breweries still producing it regularly. These breweries have consequently been credited with helping to keep the porter style in production. Rather than using the traditional top-fermenting ale yeasts employed in most porters, Yuengling's porter is bottom-fermented. It has been known as "Pottsville Porter" since the 19th century.

- Lord Chesterfield Ale

Named for Philip Stanhope, 4th Earl of Chesterfield, Lord Chesterfield Ale is Yuengling's hoppiest beer. Although Yuengling brewed ales in the 19th century, Lord Chesterfield Ale was introduced in 1934 and was described at the time as a Canadian-type ale. Originally top-fermented in wooden tanks, it was switched to bottom-fermenting yeast in the 1960s, reportedly without a change in taste or character. Like Traditional Lager, it is usually sold in green bottles, although it is also available in cans. It contains corn and is highly carbonated, tending to produce a large but short-lived head when poured. Lord Chesterfield was no longer sold in kegs as of 2007, although quarter kegs returned to the market in October 2008.

- Golden Pilsner

Introduced in 2018, Golden Pilsner was Yuengling's first new year-round beer in 17 years. Made with pale and specialty malts and Hallertau and Saaz hops, it has an ABV of 4.7 percent and contains 135 calories. It was initially distributed to selected markets beginning April 1, 2018, before expanding throughout Yuengling's then-22-state distribution area.

- Yuengling Oktoberfest

A seasonal beer first produced in 2011 for the Oktoberfest season. It is currently Yuengling's only seasonal beer.

- FLIGHT by Yuengling

Introduced in 2020, FLIGHT by Yuengling is a light beer with fewer calories and carbohydrates than other beers in the company's product line. The brewery marketed it as the "next generation of light beer".

- Yuengling Bock

Bock beer returned in February 2009 after having last been brewed by Yuengling in the 1970s. The style was popular in the 19th century as a celebratory beer and was often brewed for May Day events. According to company sources, Yuengling Bock was initially intended to be sold only on draft as a spring seasonal beer. Following its popularity, it was made available in kegs and cases in January 2010. Bock was discontinued in early 2015 after failing to meet sales expectations. It was reintroduced with a new design in 2024 as a limited-time release.

=== No longer produced ===
- Summer Wheat

Yuengling introduced Summer Wheat in 2014. It was 4.5 percent ABV and less hoppy than the company's other beers. It was described as "a southern true authentic Bavarian-style wheat beer". Summer Wheat was discontinued in 2017 along with Yuengling IPL as "part of a business strategy to focus more on the core brands".

- Yuengling IPL

A 5 percent ABV India Pale Lager made with Bravo, Belma, Cascade, and Citra hops. The IPL was first brewed in 2015 and was discontinued along with Summer Wheat in 2017.

- Old German

In 1978, Old German was described as darker than Yuengling Premium, with a deep yellow-gold color, an aroma resembling burnt baked potato, a sharp hop taste, and a bitter finish. It was priced below Yuengling Premium.

- Half & Half

Half & Half originated at the Northeast Taproom in Reading, where Dark-Brewed Porter and Lord Chesterfield Ale were mixed in equal proportions. The bar subsequently asked Yuengling to supply the mixture premixed on draft, leading to the introduction of the official Half & Half product. It was replaced by Original Black & Tan in 1986 and discontinued.
