= Pal Joey =

Pal Joey may refer to:

- Pal Joey (novel), a 1940 epistolary novel by John O'Hara
- Pal Joey (musical), a 1940 musical based on the novel
- Pal Joey (film), a 1957 film, loosely adapted from the musical of the same name
- Pal Joey (André Previn album), 1957
- Pal Joey (Kenny Drew album), 1959
- "Pal Joey" (Space Ghost Coast to Coast), a television episode

== See also ==
- Joey Pal, Canadian football player
