= Appointment in Samarra =

1934 novel by John O'Hara

- Author: John O'Hara
- Language: English
- Publisher: Grosset & Dunlap
- Publication date: 1934
- Media type: Print (Hardcover)
- OCLC: 3143585
- Dewey Decimal: 813.5/2
- LC Class: PS3529.H29

Appointment in Samarra, published in 1934, is the first novel by American writer John O'Hara (1905–1970). It concerns the self-destruction of the fictional character Julian English, a wealthy car dealer who was once a member of the social elite of Gibbsville (O'Hara's fictionalized version of Pottsville, Pennsylvania). The book created controversy due to O'Hara's inclusion of sexual content.

In 1998, the Modern Library ranked Appointment in Samarra 22nd on its list of the 100 best English-language novels of the 20th century.

== Title ==
The title is a reference to W. Somerset Maugham's retelling of an ancient Mesopotamian tale which appears as an epigraph for the novel:

There was a merchant in Baghdad who sent his servant to market to buy provisions and in a little while the servant came back, white and trembling, and said, Master, just now when I was in the marketplace I was jostled by a woman in the crowd and when I turned I saw it was Death that jostled me. She looked at me and made a threatening gesture; now, lend me your horse, and I will ride away from this city and avoid my fate. I will go to Samarra and there Death will not find me. The merchant lent him his horse, and the servant mounted it, and he dug his spurs in its flanks and as fast as the horse could gallop he went. Then the merchant went down to the marketplace and he saw me standing in the crowd and he came to me and said, Why did you make a threatening gesture to my servant when you saw him this morning? That was not a threatening gesture, I said, it was only a start of surprise. I was astonished to see him in Baghdad, for I had an appointment with him tonight in Samarra.

In his foreword to the 1952 reprint, O'Hara says that the working title for the novel was The Infernal Grove. He got the idea for the title Appointment in Samarra when Dorothy Parker showed him the story in Maugham's play, Sheppey. He says "Dorothy didn't like the title; [publisher] Alfred Harcourt didn't like the title; his editors didn't like it; nobody liked it but me." O'Hara describes it as a reference to "the inevitability of Julian English's death".

== Plot ==
The novel describes how, over the course of three days, Julian English destroys himself with a series of impulsive acts, culminating in suicide. O'Hara never gives any obvious cause or explanation for his behavior, which is apparently predestined by his character. Facts about Julian gradually emerge throughout the novel. He is about 30 years old. He is college educated, owns a well-established Cadillac dealership, and within the Gibbsville community belongs to the prestigious "Lantenengo Street crowd".

English is introduced seven pages into the novel, in the thoughts of the wife of one of his employees: "She wouldn't trade her life for Caroline English's, not if you paid her. She wondered if Julian and Caroline were having another one of their battle royales". Within the three days of the novel, Julian gets drunk several times. One long lyrical paragraph describes one of his hangovers. During the first of two suicidal reveries, we learn that his greatest fear is that he will eventually lose his wife to another man. Yet within three days, he sexually propositions two women, succeeding once, with an ease and confidence suggesting this is well-practiced behavior.

On successive days, he commits three impulsive acts, which are serious enough to damage his reputation, his business, and his relationship with his wife. First, he throws a drink in the face of Harry Reilly, a man we learn later is an important investor in his business. The man is a sufficiently well-known Catholic that Julian knows word will spread among the Gibbsville Catholic community, many of whom are his customers.

In a curious device, repeated for each of the incidents, the omniscient narrator never actually shows us the details of the incident. He shows us Julian fantasizing in great detail about throwing the drink; but, we are told, "he knew he would not throw the drink" because he was in financial debt to Harry and because "people would say he was sore because Reilly ... was elaborately attentive to Caroline English". The narrator's vision shifts elsewhere, and several pages later we are surprised to hear a character report "Jeezozz H. Kee-rist! Julian English just threw a highball in Harry Reilly's face!"

The second event occurs at a roadhouse, where Julian goes with his wife and some friends. Julian gets drunk and invites a provocatively clad woman to go out to his car with him. The woman is, in fact, a gangster's girlfriend, and one of the gangster's men is present, sent to watch her. Both Julian's wife and the gangster's aide see the couple leave. What actually happens in the car is left ambiguous, but that is unimportant, since all observers assume that sexual congress has ensued. There is not any assumption that violence will ensue. However, the gangster is a valued automobile customer who in the past has recommended Julian's dealership to his acquaintances. As Julian is driven home, pretending to be asleep, he "felt the tremendous excitement, the great thrilling lump in the chest and abdomen that comes before the administering of an unknown, well-deserved punishment. He knew he was in for it."

Third, the next day, during lunch at the Lantenengo Club, Julian engages in a complicated brawl with a one-armed war veteran named Froggy Ogden, who is also Caroline's cousin. Julian thought of Froggy as an old friend, but Froggy acknowledges to Julian that he has always detested him and had not wanted his cousin Caroline to marry him. In the brawl, which Froggy has arguably started, Julian hits Froggy and at least one of a group of bystanders in the club.

He experiences two suicidal daydreams that oddly contrast with each other. In the first of the two dreams, after Caroline's temporary departure, he places a gun in his mouth:

Julian thought and thought about Caroline and Harry, and thought against them, against their being drawn to each other sexually, which was the big thing that mattered. "By God, no one else will have her in bed," he said, to the empty office. And immediately began the worst fear he had ever known that this day, this week, this minute, next year, sometime she would open herself to another man and close herself around him. Oh, if she did that it would be forever.

He does not, however, commit suicide at that time. His second suicidal reverie is after a failed attempt to seduce a woman, the local society reporter. He believes that, as a result of his behavior and of the community's sympathy for Caroline, "no girl in Gibbsville—worth having—would risk the loss of reputation which would be her punishment for getting herself identified with him." He believes that even if he divorces Caroline, he is destined to spend the rest of his life hearing:

No, let's not have him, he's one of the older guys. Wish Julian English would act his age ... No thanks, Julian, I'd rather walk. No thanks, Mr. English, I haven't much farther to go. Julian, I wish you wouldn't call me so much. My father gets furious. You better leave me at the corner becuss if my old man. Listen, you, leave my sister alone.

After this and other indications that he had mis-gauged his social status, he commits suicide by carbon monoxide poisoning, running his car in a closed garage.

== Analysis ==
O'Hara biographer Frank MacShane writes "The excessiveness of Julian's suicide is what makes Appointment in Samarra so much a part of its time. Julian doesn't belong to Fitzgerald's Jazz Age; he is ten years younger and belongs to what came to be called the hangover generation, the young people who grew up accustomed to the good life without having to earn it. This is the generation that had so little to defend itself with when the depression came in 1929."

O'Hara's books tended to push the limits of what was considered tolerable in a mainstream novel. His second, BUtterfield 8, was notorious and was banned from importation into Australia until 1963. But Appointment In Samarra was controversial too. Biographer Geoffrey Wolff quotes a Saturday Review article by Yale University professor Henry Seidel Canby, entitled "Mr. O'Hara and the Vulgar School", and also cites Sinclair Lewis's denunciation of the book's sensuality as "nothing but infantilism – the erotic visions of a hobbledehoy behind the barn."

Most of O'Hara's descriptions of sexuality are indirect: "There was the time Elinor Holloway ... shinnied half way up the flagpole while five young gentlemen, standing at the foot of the pole, verified the suspicion that Elinor, who had not always lived in Gibbsville, was not naturally, or at least not entirely, a blonde." However, passages like the following were quite unusual for the time:

She was wearing a dress that was cut in front so he could all but see her belly-button, but the material, the satin or whatever it was, it held close to her body so that when she stood up she only showed about a third of each breast. But when she was sitting down across the table from him she leaned forward with her elbows on the table and her chin in her hands, and that loosened the dress so that whenever she made a move he could see the nipples of her breasts. She saw him looking—he couldn't help looking. And she smiled.
