= Death of Starr Faithfull =

American socialite and model (1906–1931)

Starr Faithfull
- Born: Marian Starr Wyman; January 27, 1906; Evanston, Illinois, U.S.
- Died: c. June 6, 1931 (age 25); Long Beach, New York, U.S.
- Cause of death: Drowning; undetermined whether homicide, suicide or accident
- Parent(s): Frank Wyman (father); Helen Pierce MacGregor Wyman Faithfull (mother); Stanley E. Faithfull (stepfather)

Starr Faithfull (born Marian Starr Wyman, January 27, 1906 – c. June 6, 1931) was an American socialite and a model for the Walter Thornton Modeling Agency whose mysterious drowning death in 1931 became a much-covered tabloid story. Newspapers published allegations that she had been sexually abused as a child by Andrew James Peters, a wealthy, prominent politician and former mayor of Boston (1918–1922). Peters was reportedly suspected of murdering her. Investigators were unable to determine whether her death was a homicide or a suicide, and her death remains unsolved.

Faithfull was found dead on the beach at Long Beach, New York, on the south shore of Long Island, on the morning of June 8, 1931. An autopsy found that she had died by drowning, but also bore many bruises, apparently caused by beating or rough handling, and a large dose of a sedative in her system. Investigators initially thought Faithfull's death was a homicide and that she had either been pushed into deep water or forcibly held under shallow water. Her stepfather accused Peters of having her killed to prevent her from revealing the sexual abuse. However, the homicide theory was called into question by letters that Faithfull had written shortly before her death which suggested she planned to take her own life. A grand jury convened to hear evidence returned an open verdict, and the case was closed with no definitive conclusion as to whether Faithfull's death was a homicide, suicide, or an accident.

Faithfull's death made national and international news due to its many sensational aspects, including her youth, beauty, promiscuity, and flapper lifestyle, as well as the allegations about Peters. The evidence included Faithfull's diary, which contained explicit descriptions of her sexual liaisons with nineteen different men, including one she called "AJP," who was thought to be Peters. Time magazine called the story a "sexy death mystery" with a "perfect front-page name."

Faithfull's story has inspired several fictional works, the best known of which is John O'Hara's 1935 novel BUtterfield 8. The case has been explored in numerous non-fiction books, including British crime historian Jonathan Goodman's 1990 true crime book The Passing of Starr Faithfull, which won a Gold Dagger award.

== Family ==
Starr Faithfull was born Marian Starr Wyman (nicknamed "Bamby") in Evanston, Illinois, on January 27, 1906, the first daughter of Frank Wyman II, an investment banker, and his wife Helen MacGregor Pierce of Andover, Massachusetts. In 1907, the family moved to Montclair, New Jersey, where a second daughter, Elizabeth Tucker "Sylvia" Wyman, was born in 1911.

Starr's mother Helen came from a wealthy, socially established family, but her father Frank lost his fortune before she was married, leaving her relatively poor. Her cousin Martha had married Andrew James Peters, a career politician who served as member of both the Massachusetts House and Senate; a U.S. congressman; an assistant secretary of the Treasury under U.S. President Woodrow Wilson; and mayor of Boston from 1918 to 1922. As mayor, Peters was known for his failure to avert the 1919 Boston Police Strike, which helped raise the national profile of Massachusetts Governor Calvin Coolidge. Coolidge later was elected as vice president and president of the United States. Peters was also a friend of Franklin D. Roosevelt, who was governor of New York at the time of Starr's death and who also later became president.

Helen and her daughters frequently visited her wealthy Massachusetts relatives, including Peters and his wife Martha. The Peters family were among the relatives who helped support the Wymans by giving Helen monetary gifts and paying for her daughters' private school educations. Starr attended private school in Brookline, Massachusetts, until 1921, when she enrolled at the Rogers Hall School in Lowell. She spent summers with the Peters family at their home. Andrew often took the young girl on trips alone with him, during which the two stayed in hotels.

In the winter of 1923–24, Starr left the Rogers Hall School during the Christmas break and never returned, though her relatives had paid for the spring term. She was, at that time, merely five months from graduation. Her parents divorced in 1924, and the following year her mother married Stanley Faithfull; her daughters took his name. Stanley, a widower who was previously married to the governess of Leverett Saltonstall, was a self-employed inventor and entrepreneur who failed at numerous business ventures and earned little or no money. He also had a history of bringing lawsuits for money. The Faithfulls initially settled in West Orange, New Jersey, but lost their heavily mortgaged house to foreclosure and moved to an apartment at 12 St. Luke's Place in New York City. This was their residence at the time of Starr's death in 1931. Jimmy Walker, then the mayor of New York City (from 1926 to 1932), lived a few houses away at 6 St. Luke's Place.

== Alleged abuse by Peters ==
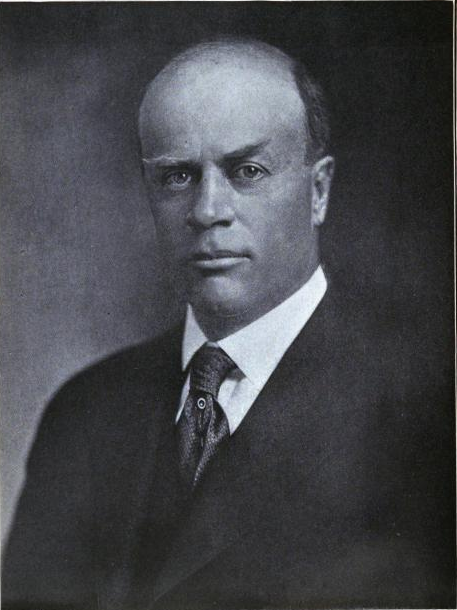
Andrew J. Peters at the time he was Mayor of Boston in 1918

During Faithfull's teenage years, she began to show signs of emotional disturbance. She eventually received psychiatric treatment, including a short voluntary stay in the Channing Sanitarium, a mental hospital in Wellesley, Massachusetts. In June 1926, Faithfull divulged to her mother that Peters had been sexually abusing her for years, beginning when she was aged 11. Faithfull alleged that Peters read her sex instructions written by Havelock Ellis and drugged her with ether before abusing her.

Stanley engaged an attorney and, in 1927, negotiated a written settlement agreement with Peters, whereby he paid the Faithfulls $20,000—supposedly to cover Starr's medical care and rehabilitation—in return for keeping the abuse secret. Although the settlement document stated this was a one-time payment, the Faithfulls received several additional large payments from Peters and may have been extorting him. The total amount paid by Peters has been estimated at around $80,000. These payments appeared to be the only source of income for Faithfull's family. It was later discovered that the Faithfulls had contacted Peters and others close to him just before Starr's disappearance and sent him a letter while she was missing, asking for more money.

According to author Jonathan Goodman, the police evidence file indicated that by 1931, gangsters unrelated to the Faithfulls had also learned about the alleged abuse, using this knowledge to extort money from Peters shortly before Faithfull's death. Russel Crouse, who wrote an early true crime account of the case, stated that the investigators "did come upon some evidence that someone other than the Faithfull family had heard the story and had attempted to make use of it in Boston."

== Lifestyle ==
Investigators learned after Faithfull's death that her mother and stepfather, acting on doctors' advice, had paid artist Edwin Megargee to be her "sex tutor" and teach her how to have normal sexual relations after her traumatic experiences with Peters. Money received from Peters was also used to send her away on cruises to the Mediterranean, the West Indies and five or six times to the United Kingdom, where she stayed for extended periods in London. When not going on cruises, Faithfull regularly attended the "bon voyage" parties held on ocean liners in port before their departures from New York, often socializing with the ships' officers. At one point she claimed to be engaged to an officer, who denied it and left her stranded in London without funds. Faithfull regularly visited nightclubs and speakeasies, drank and used drugs, once nearly overdosing on sleeping pills in London. In March 1931, she was briefly committed to Bellevue Hospital after being found drunk, naked and beaten in a New York hotel room; she had checked into the hotel as "Joseph Collins and wife," with a man she had apparently just met.

On May 29, 1931, a few days before her death, Faithfull attended a party on the Cunard liner RMS Franconia to see the ship's doctor, Dr. George Jameson-Carr. She had been infatuated with Carr for some time and considered him the love of her life, although he did not return her affections. After Carr made Faithfull leave his sitting room because the ship was departing, she remained on deck when Franconia left the dock, despite having no ticket (which at that point she could not afford). Upon being discovered, she was forcibly removed from the ship and sent back to the pier on a tugboat, screaming, "Kill me! Throw me overboard!" Newspapers and Faithfull's friends later reported that she had attempted to stow away in order to be with Carr and return to London. However, in a letter to Carr, she wrote that she did not intend to stow away and had simply become too drunk to disembark. This explanation may have been intended to protect Carr from getting into trouble with his employer, Cunard, over the incident.

== Death ==
In the days leading up to her disappearance and death, Faithfull kept a busy social schedule. She was seen by numerous witnesses, including her friends and family as well as taxi drivers and other strangers. Faithfull's family last saw her on the morning of Friday, June 5, 1931, leaving the house in the same dress she was wearing when found. Investigators discovered that after she left the house that day, she made multiple trips to ocean liners docked in Manhattan, where she visited ship's officers. After spending the evening with one of them, she got into a taxi late on Friday night and seemingly vanished. She was found dead on a Long Island beach the following Monday morning, on June 8.

=== Events before discovery of body ===
==== Thursday, June 4, 1931 ====
After Faithfull's death, a taxi driver and other witnesses reported that on the afternoon of Thursday, June 4, an intoxicated woman whom they later recognized as Faithfull was helped into a cab in front of the Chanin Building on 42nd Street, Manhattan. The taxi driver testified that she stopped to buy additional liquor during her ride and that he drove her to Flushing, Queens, in search of a certain house, but she could not locate it. Faithfull left his cab at a drugstore located at 33rd Avenue and 163rd Street.

On the evening of June 4, Faithfull told her mother and sister that she had attended a party given by publisher Bennett Cerf for actress Miriam Hopkins (whom she confused with actress Peggy Hopkins Joyce) in Cerf's office at 20 E. 57th Street in Manhattan. According to her mother, she mentioned seeing two friends of hers, actors named "Bruce Winston" and "Jack Greenaway", at the party, and said she would be meeting up with them the following night as well. Another friend, Dr. Charles Young Roberts, later said that Faithfull had spent the evening of June 4 with him at The Roosevelt Hotel, visiting a speakeasy and going for a taxi ride.

==== Friday, June 5, 1931 ====
Faithfull's family reported seeing her for the last time leaving their apartment on St. Luke's Place at 9:30am on the morning of Friday, June 5, wearing an expensive silk dress, hat, gloves, shoes and stockings, and carrying a purse and coat. She had $3 and was planning to have her hair waved. According to her family, Faithfull never returned home.

The Chelsea Piers in Manhattan, circa 1921. The Cunard ocean liners and other passenger liners docked at these terminals.

A newsstand vendor located near the Ninth Street subway station in Greenwich Village, of whom Faithfull was a regular customer, said that he sold her a newspaper at 11:30 am. At 1:00pm, taxi driver Murray Edelman said that Faithfull, whom he recognized from the Franconia incident several days earlier, had gotten into his cab near the Chelsea Piers (from which the Cunard ships and other passenger liners departed) with a man in a Cunard uniform, whom she called "Brucie". She told the man she would see him on the wharf at 4:00pm, but the man told her not to come back. Edelman said he drove her to her home at 12 St. Luke's Place, although he did not see her enter the house (and her family said she had not returned home). He delivered the man back to the piers. Around 2:00pm, Faithfull, having apparently returned to the piers and now appearing intoxicated, again was put into Edelman's waiting cab by the same man, who told Edelman to take her back to St. Luke's Place and not let her return to the piers again. However, she got out after a few blocks because she had only ten cents, which was not sufficient for the fare. Edelman saw her walking back in the direction of the piers.

A beauty shop employee in Grand Central Terminal said that a "Miss Faithfull" had visited the shop on June 5 between 2:30 and 3:00pm, and spoken to her about an appointment. A female acquaintance of Faithfull also reported seeing her at the terminal around the same time. Later, she was seen on board the Cunard liner RMS Mauretania, but was also seen leaving the ship before its 5:00pm departure for the Bahamas.

Carr and Roberts later said that, after visiting Mauretania, Faithfull had visited another Cunard liner in port, the RMS Carmania, to which Roberts was then assigned. He confirmed that on June 5 he entertained Faithfull aboard Carmania from about 5:30pm until after 10:00pm, including having a light meal at 8:30pm. She had said she wanted to travel to Calcutta and Paris, where she said she had a woman friend who had willed her some money. Roberts said that shortly after 10:00pm, he gave Faithfull a dollar for cab fare and put her into a taxi near Pier 56, supposedly to drive her to another ocean liner, the Île de France, on which she planned to attend a party. A police officer who recognized Faithfull from the Franconia incident saw her getting into the taxi.

==== Saturday, June 6 and Sunday, June 7, 1931 ====
Police informants later told investigators that on Saturday, June 6, a woman fitting Faithfull's description had been seen with a male companion at Tappe's Hotel in Island Park, New York, near Long Beach. She may have had an argument with her companion or have left with a group of other men. The hotel was a favorite rendezvous for New York mobsters and bootleggers, including Bill Dwyer, Vannie Higgins and Dutch Schultz.

After Faithfull's family had failed to locate her by the evening of Saturday, June 6, her stepfather reported her missing to the Missing Persons Bureau of the New York City Police Department (NYPD). Her parents also sent a letter to Peters on June 7 informing him that their daughter was missing, again seeking money.

=== Discovery of body on Monday, June 8, 1931 ===
On the morning of Monday, June 8, around 6:30 am, Faithfull's dead body was found by a beachcomber at Long Beach, on the beach near Minnesota Avenue. When found, she was wearing only her dress, silk stockings, and a suspender girdle that held up the stockings, with no other underwear. The rest of her outer clothing and accessories were missing. Neither her dress nor her manicured nails were damaged, although her body showed numerous bruises that the medical examiner stated had been inflicted before death, apparently by another person. Faithfull's body was identified by her stepfather, Stanley, on the evening of June 8.

An autopsy determined that Faithfull had died of drowning and that her body had been in the water for at least forty-eight hours, suggesting that she died on the night of Friday, June 5, or the early morning of Saturday, June 6. The time spent in the water and her estimated time of death would later be questioned by another expert, who had handled drowning cases in the Long Beach area for many years and believed that she had been in the water for less than ten hours, meaning that she had died late on Sunday, June 7 or in the early morning of June 8, and probably drowned close to the beach where she was found. Faithfull's lungs contained a large quantity of sand, which was later interpreted as indicating that she drowned in shallow water near shore, rather than further out to sea.

The autopsy also revealed that Faithfull had eaten a large meal of meat, potatoes, mushrooms and fruit three to four hours before her death but had not drunk alcohol for 36 hours before her death. Her liver contained a high level of a drug initially identified as the barbiturate Veronal – a sedative that she frequently purchased and used. Before her death, Faithfull had taken a dose large enough to cause stupor or semi-stupor, but not large enough to kill her. A toxicologist's letter and other evidence later suggested that she might have taken a similar but stronger drug such as Luminal or Allonal, which would have increased her stupor. The medical report initially stated that Faithfull had been raped; a second report ruled out rape, but stated she had sexual intercourse shortly before her death.

== Investigation ==
Faithfull's death was initially investigated as a homicide. With new evidence, investigators came to believe that she died by suicide or suffered a fatal accident, caused by her jumping or falling overboard from a ship. The Faithfulls insisted her death was a homicide and accused Peters of having her murdered; they revealed their allegations to the media. In so doing, the Faithfulls came under suspicion themselves for not cooperating fully with police and for having a monetary motive to accuse Peters, whose money they had been living on for years. The case was finally closed with no conclusion being reached as to whether Faithfull's death was a homicide, suicide, or accident. Several true crime writers have written books offering their own alternative theories about her death.

=== Homicide investigation ===
The investigation into Faithfull's death was led by Nassau County Police Inspector Harold King, Nassau County District Attorney Elvin Edwards, and Assistant DA Martin Littleton Jr. After identifying his stepdaughter's body, Stanley told King and Littleton that he believed Peters had ordered her murder in order to prevent her from revealing her past sexual abuse. He also told the press that he believed his stepdaughter had been murdered, but initially did not give them Peters' name. Stanley eventually told them Faithfull had been "corrupted" as a child by an unnamed older, wealthy male friend of the family who had later paid a settlement. London artist Rudolph Haybrook, a close friend of Faithfull, also was quoted in the press as saying she was murdered to prevent her from testifying in an upcoming $25,000 lawsuit.

Although King thought the death was probably a suicide, even after hearing Stanley's story, Edwards was convinced that it was murder. At his direction, investigators began to examine the death as a homicide, with Edwards traveling to Boston and announcing that he expected to indict two unnamed men in her death, one of whom he said "played an important role in New York political circles." At that time, Peters was helping to organize the first presidential campaign for his friend, Governor Roosevelt of New York.

Faithfull's body was due to be cremated on June 11, but Edwards dramatically ordered the cremation stopped at the last minute so he could convene a grand jury to look into her death. A police search of the Faithfull family's apartment found the dead woman's diary, despite Stanley's claims that no diary existed and/or that it had been destroyed. The diary, which Faithfull called her "Memory Book" or "Mem Book", contained explicit details of her affairs with nineteen men identified by initials. Although much of the diary was considered too risqué to print, some of its material was featured in newspapers. The initials "AJP" in some diary entries were thought to refer to Peters. When newspapers began to connect Peters to the case, he issued a statement via his lawyer denying that he had ever had "improper relations" with Faithfull. He said he had no evidence relating to her death and had not seen any member of the Faithfull family for five years. Peters was later formally questioned by investigators in the fall of 1931 but continued to deny any involvement.

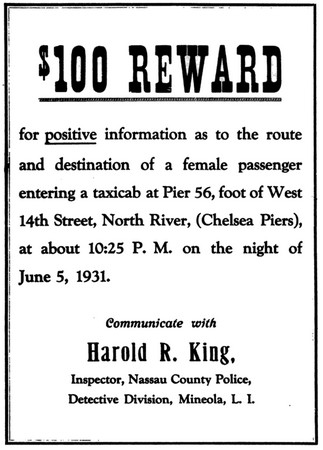
Nassau County Police reward poster seeking information about Starr Faithfull's whereabouts after she left the Carmania on the night of June 5, 1931

Initially, investigators thought Faithfull had either been pushed from Mauretania or abducted from that ship into a boat, from which she was pushed into the water. Later, the large amount of sand found in her lungs, coupled with the bruises to her upper body, caused them to believe that she had been drowned in the sandy water close to shore by being forcibly held underwater, perhaps near the spot where she was found, rather than having been pushed from a ship several miles offshore and having her body wash up on shore. They gathered information from the United States Coast Guard about the tides and currents near Long Beach in an effort to determine how Faithfull's body might have arrived on the beach, but the results of this query were never published.

The man named "Brucie", mentioned by taxi driver Edelman, was at first thought to be the actor "Bruce Winston", whom Faithfull had said she met at Cerf's party. Attempts to locate the "Bruce Winston" and "Jack Greenaway" supposedly mentioned by Faithfull proved fruitless. An elderly British actor named Bruce Winston was found, but he had not been in the U.S. since February and had spent the past several weeks appearing in a play in London. Investigators then sought a Chicago gangster named Ernest Blue, alias Richard Bruce. An acquaintance of Faithfull named David "Bruce" Blue was finally located in London, and he affirmed that he had been with her on Mauretania on June 5.

Efforts were made to locate the taxi driver who picked up Faithfull near Pier 56 after 10:00 pm on June 5. Despite substantial reward money being offered for information about Faithfull's route and destination that night, no taxi driver ever came forward. There was speculation that she was abducted by a taxi driver, or by someone else posing as a taxi driver and possibly under the control of mobsters.

Although Edwards and Littleton continued to investigate the death as a possible homicide until December 1931, including questioning Peters, they were unable to gather sufficient evidence to obtain indictments or otherwise prove the homicide theory.

=== Suicide and accident investigation ===
While investigators were pursuing the homicide theory, Carr, having arrived in London on Franconia, received three letters that Faithfull had written to him dated May 30, June 2, and June 4, 1931. He personally hand-carried the letters back to the U.S. and provided them to the investigators around June 23, also being interviewed by police at that time. The New York Times published the full text of the letters on June 22 and June 24.

In the first letter, dated May 30, Faithfull wrote,

I am going (definitely now – I've been thinking of it for a long time) to end my worthless, disorderly bore of an existence – before I ruin any one else's life as well. I certainly have made a sordid, futureless mess of it all...I hate everything so – life is horrible...I am mad and insane over you...I have, strangely enough, more of a feeling of peace or whatever you call it now that I know it will soon be over. The half hour before I die will, I imagine, be quite blissful.

But she ended the letter by asking Carr to come and see her when he was next in New York, causing some to question Faithfull's true intentions. The second letter apologized for the May 29 incident aboard Franconia in New York.

In the third letter, written the day before she disappeared, Faithfull expressed in detail her intent and plans to die by suicide because she could not cope with her unrequited love for Carr. The letter began,

It's all up with me now. This is something I am going to put through. The only thing that bothers me about it—the only thing I dread—is being outwitted and prevented from doing this, which is the only possible thing for me to do. If one wants to get away with murder one has to jolly well keep one's wits about one. It's the same way with suicide. If I don't watch out I will wake up in a psychopathic ward, but I intend to watch out and accomplish my end this time.

The letter went on to talk about how she would carry out her suicide, with "[n]o ether, no allonal, or window jumping", and how she would spend her last hours, including having "one delicious meal", hearing some "good music", drinking "slowly, keeping aware every second", enjoying a "last cigarette", and "encourag[ing]" men who flirted with her on the street—"I don't care who they are." She wrote, "It's a great life when one has twenty-four hours to live." (An earlier Associated Press story that ran before Carr delivered the letters stated that one letter contained the statement, "When you receive this I will be dead." According to a later New York Daily News account, the statement was "When you receive this letter, I will have committed suicide by drowning." But this statement is not contained in any of the letters published in the Times in June 1931.)

The letters raised the possibility that Faithfull had taken her own life by stowing away aboard one of the ships in port in New York on June 5 until its voyage was underway, and then, after taking a large dose of sedative, jumping overboard as the ship passed south of Long Beach late on June 5 or early on June 6. Her body eventually washed up on shore. Alternatively, it was thought that Faithfull might have stowed away and then accidentally fallen overboard while under the influence of the sedative. Following the disclosure of the letters, many people, including Inspector King (who had taken the position early in the investigation that the death was likely suicide or an accident) thought that Faithfull had died by suicide. The Times reported that the letters "seemed to remove all doubt that the girl...ended her own life."

Stanley continued to insist that his stepdaughter had been murdered, contending that the letters were forgeries. He presented his own handwriting expert to testify to the grand jury in an attempt to disprove the Nassau County expert's findings that the letters were genuine. Edwards and Littleton also still believed that Faithfull had been murdered, and continued their investigation for several more months. Edwards thought that she would not have been capable of suicide while under the influence of so much Veronal.

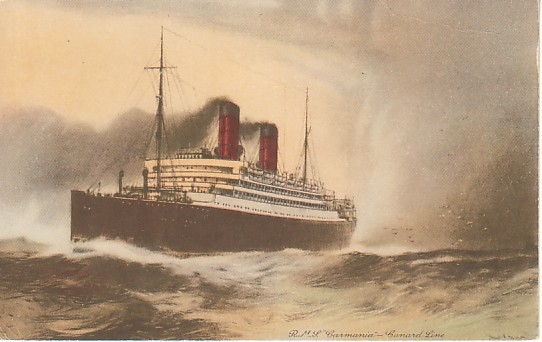
RMS Carmania, the Cunard liner on which Starr Faithfull spent the evening of June 5, 1931, with Dr. Charles Young Roberts

Littleton eventually came to believe the suicide theory after interviewing Roberts in December 1931, near the end of the investigation. Based on his information about spending the evening with Faithfull on Carmania and then putting her into a taxi to go to a party aboard Île de France, Littleton concluded that she probably stowed away on Île de France and then jumped overboard after it sailed. Littleton issued a denial in the Times of an International News Service story claiming that he had located a witness who saw Faithfull jump from a ship.

Later crime analysts have disputed the suicide conclusion. American true crime author Jay Robert Nash wrote in his book Open Files: A Narrative Encyclopedia of the World's Greatest Unsolved Crimes (1983) that there was no evidence of Faithfull ever having been aboard Île de France, and little evidence that she had died by suicide, compared to more evidence that her death had been homicide. Goodman, in his The Passing of Starr Faithfull (1990), stated that she could not have gone aboard Île de France because it sailed at 10pm while she was still visiting Roberts. Also, it was docked close enough to Carmania that she would not have taken a taxi to it. Goodman also concluded that she did not go overboard from any of the other ships leaving on June 5 or June 6 because, among other things, she would not have had the time or inclination to consume her large final meal so soon after eating a light meal of different food with Roberts; her conversation with Roberts indicated that she did not have any barbiturates or any money to obtain them on June 5; and she had been seen intoxicated on both June 4 and June 5, contrary to the autopsy, which found she had consumed no alcohol for 36 hours before death. This suggests that she did not die until June 7 or early on June 8. Neither her silk dress nor silk stockings showed the damage expected from her having been 48 hours in the water, during a time when a storm was affecting the area.

=== The Faithfulls' reaction to the investigation ===
During the course of the investigation, Edwards and Littleton became suspicious of the Faithfull family and thought they were withholding information, being less than cooperative, and may even have been involved in the murder. Newspapers also reported on the family's apparent need for money and lack of visible means of support.

After the evidence of Faithfull's possible suicide came to light in late June 1931, the grand jury proceedings were closed, with no indictments issued, and the case began to fade from the headlines. Stanley, anxious to keep the press interested in the story, continued to state that his stepdaughter was murdered by hired killers acting on behalf of a high-profile person. In July, he alleged "shameful official negligence" on the part of the Nassau County investigators and further alleged that Edwards had been intimidated by persons "too big and influential for him to tackle". Edwards strongly denied that he had been intimidated and said that he believed Faithfull had been murdered but did not have the evidence to prove it. He added, "Neither Peters nor anybody else is so highly placed that I won't proceed against them."

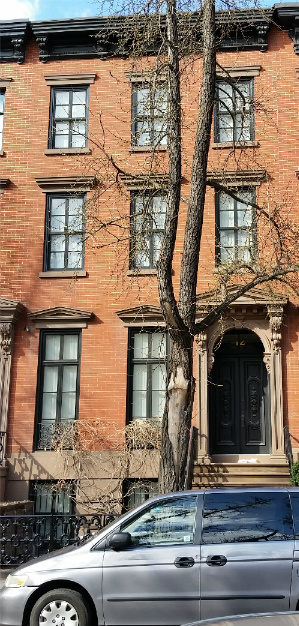
12 St. Luke's Place in Greenwich Village, New York City, in 2016. The Faithfulls lived in an apartment here at the time of Starr Faithfull's death.

On July 25, Stanley publicly accused Peters as the man alleged to have had an improper relationship with Faithfull when she was aged 11. He also disclosed the original 1927 settlement agreement between the Faithfulls and Peters releasing him from liability for Starr's abuse and his settlement check for $20,000. As a result of being publicly connected with the case, Peters suffered several nervous breakdowns.

In late July and early August, the grand jury probe was reopened to consider evidence provided by Stanley that the suicide letters provided by Carr were forgeries not written by his stepdaughter. In early August, Governor Roosevelt also reviewed the case to determine whether the death had been properly investigated by the Nassau County authorities. The Daily News, which had been conducting its own investigation, confirmed that the Faithfulls were struggling financially and that Stanley had traveled to Boston shortly before Faithfull's disappearance to seek additional payoffs from Peters. Stanley responded by suing the publisher of the Daily News, the reporter who wrote the stories, and several other papers for libel, but his claims were ultimately dismissed.

=== Conclusion of the investigation ===
By October 1931, the Faithfull case was reported to be "virtually closed". But Roberts' statements about being with her aboard Carmania were not obtained until the planned last days of the investigation in early December. Later in December, a final inquest was held into her death. It lasted fifteen minutes and the jury reached no conclusion. Nassau County Coroner Edward Neu was quoted as saying, "Whatever I decide, it will only be a matter of opinion."

=== Alternative theories ===
Goodman theorized that Faithfull was killed by Long Island mobster Vannie Higgins and his associates. According to his research, Higgins had learned that the Faithfulls were extorting Peters due to his past abuse of their daughter. Based on this information, Goodman suggested that Higgins, wishing to blackmail Peters or extort more money from him, had Faithfull kidnapped and driven to Island Park, where he provided her with a meal and barbiturates and questioned her in an effort to get more information that he could use against Peters. Unsatisfied with her answers, he beat her, causing the many bruises on her body. When she appeared to have died from the beating, he ordered her body dumped into the ocean near Long Beach. However, she was still alive when she entered the water and died by drowning.

Nash and reporter Morris Markey, who covered the case in 1931 for The New Yorker, both theorized that based on the evidence and Faithfull's past behavior, including the hotel incident that resulted in her being taken to Bellevue Hospital, she had likely been killed on the beach by an unknown man after a sexual encounter had gone wrong. According to this theory, Faithfull went to the beach with a man she had picked up, ostensibly for sex. Once there, she removed most of her clothing, but then teased or refused sex until the man became enraged, beat her, and drowned her in the shallow water and sand near the shoreline, possibly after sexually assaulting her. Goodman acknowledged that this theory is supported by some facts.

== Aftermath ==
Peters was never prosecuted for any crime in connection with Faithfull's death. Although his personal reputation was harmed by the scandal, he still maintained some political status. He served as treasurer of a Massachusetts state campaign against money-hoarding organized at the request of President Herbert Hoover in 1932, and was named to the Massachusetts Advisory Committee of the Home Owners' Loan Corporation in 1933. He died in 1938.

Faithfull's 19-year-old sister Tucker (a.k.a. Sylvia) was quoted after Starr's death as saying, "I'm not sorry Starr's dead. She's happier. Everyone is happier." According to Tucker, her sister had dominated the family, even to the point of deciding where they would live, and physically slapped and pinched other family members if she did not get her own way. Tucker later changed her name back to Wyman before marrying. Newspaper columnist Dorothy Kilgallen reported Stanley's death in 1949.

A 1946 Associated Press story on the death of former-DA Edwards discussed the Faithfull case as one of two high-profile unsolved cases handled by him. Edwards' records on the case were later said to have vanished. The police file survived and was reviewed by Goodman in writing his 1990 book about the case.

According to John O'Hara biographer Matthew J. Bruccoli, O'Hara had Faithfull's diary in his possession for some time and used it as research material in writing his 1935 novel BUtterfield 8. Some sources have written that police lost or destroyed the diary after the case was closed. A 2002 article in The Baltimore Sun reported that the diary may have eventually been given to Peters, who locked it in a box hidden in the library paneling of his Boston home, where it was later found by the home's new owners. However, its whereabouts were unknown as of 2002.

== In popular culture ==
Faithfull's life and death inspired several fictional novels. She has also been discussed in a number of non-fiction books and anthologies, as well as some other works.

=== Fiction ===
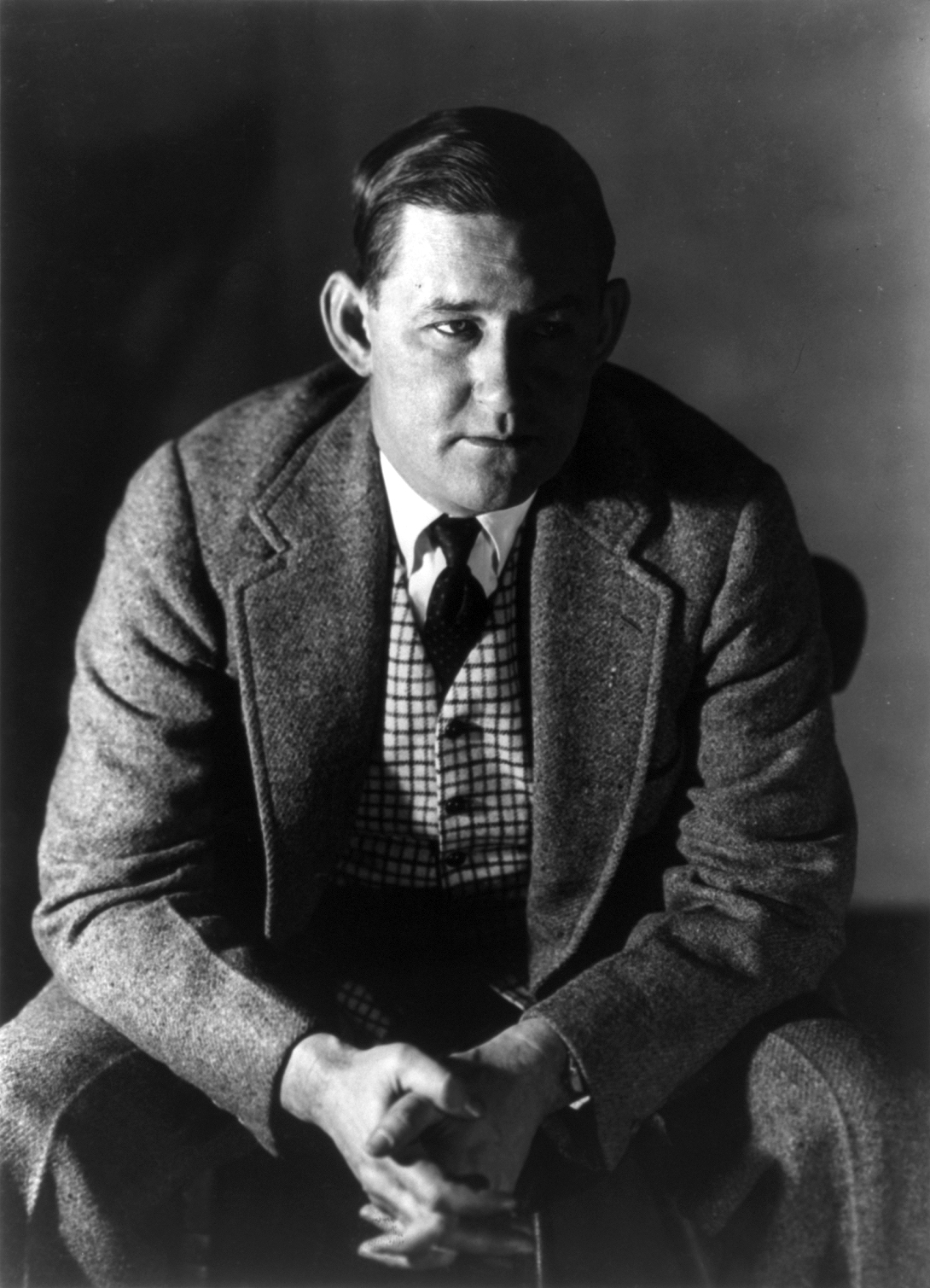
John O'Hara

Several novels have been based on Faithfull's story. The first and best known is John O'Hara's second novel BUtterfield 8 (Harcourt, Brace, 1935). O'Hara's fictional protagonist Gloria Wandrous was based on Faithfull, whose diary O'Hara had read and whom he had seen in New York speakeasies when she was alive, although he did not know her well. Contemporary readers recognized that the book was based on the Faithfull case.

In the novel, Gloria is molested as a child by a prominent older man, becomes a heavy-drinking call girl, and dies by being swept under the paddlewheel of a boat. O'Hara later wrote that "[t]he story of Gloria Wandrous had appeared as fact in the newspapers, along with her excerpted diary that could not all be printed either in a newspaper or a novel. If anything, I toned the story down[.]" However, Sandra Scoppettone, who wrote a later novel about Faithfull, quoted the Faithfulls' landlady as saying that O'Hara visited her to research his novel, "asked a lot of questions" and "wrote a book, but he got it all wrong."

BUtterfield 8 sold well when first published, and was later adapted into a 1960 film starring Elizabeth Taylor, who won the Academy Award for Best Actress for her performance. O'Hara was not involved in writing the film adaptation, which bore little resemblance to his novel and ended with Gloria's death in an automobile accident, rather than a suicide or homicide by drowning.

Poet Ogden Nash, who usually wrote humorous verse, penned a very serious poem titled "The Tale of the Thirteenth Floor", about a man who is ready to commit murder until he views the thirteenth floor of a seedy New York hotel. The floor, which is only visible one night a year, contains a version of hell in which murderers are forced to dance forever with the bodies of their victims. Faithfull is listed by name as one such victim.

Other works of fiction based on Faithfull's life and death are listed below.

- The Love Thieves by Peter Packer (Holt, Rinehart & Winston, 1962) tells the story of Virginia Fuller, a character based on Faithfull, in the context of a libel suit brought by her parents against a newspaper after her death, similar to the real-life lawsuits brought by Stanley.
- Some Unknown Person by Sandra Scoppettone (Putnam, 1977) is a novel based on the Faithfull story in which she commits suicide with the involvement of a fictional character, Orlando Antolini, whose life story is told in flashbacks alongside Faithfull's. Scoppettone said that she used her own Italian-American family background to create the Antolini family. Florence King wrote in National Review that "[the novel's] confrontational scene between the pedophilic Mayor Peters and Massachusetts governor Calvin Coolidge at the height of the [Boston] police strike makes a persuasive argument that Starr Faithfull put Coolidge in the White House."
- The Memory Book of Starr Faithfull: A Novel by Gloria Vanderbilt (Knopf, 1994) is a novel in diary form based on Faithfull's life and her real "Mem Book" diary. It recounts her story from age 11 through the time of her death, focusing on her sexual abuse by Peters and her relationships with men. Although it contains some factual material, most of the book is Vanderbilt's fictional imagined concept of the contents of the real diary.
- The Contract by William Palmer (Jonathan Cape, 1995) is a novel about Starr Faithfull's death and the subsequent revelations about her life, family and past, narrated by the fictionalized Starr Faithfull and her mother, Helen.

=== Non-fiction ===
A non-fiction essay, "The Mysterious Death of Starr Faithfull", was written by Morris Markey, who covered the story and interviewed the Faithfull family in 1931 as the original "reporter at large" for The New Yorker magazine. The essay was included in the collection The Aspirin Age (ed. Isabel Leighton, Simon and Schuster, 1949), a selection of pieces about the essential events of American life in the years between World War I and World War II.

Two non-fiction true crime books have been written about the Starr Faithfull case. The first, The Girl on the Lonely Beach by Fred J. Cook (Red Seal Books, 1956) discusses her family background, based on newspaper reports, court transcripts and Cook's own interviews.

The second, The Passing of Starr Faithfull by Jonathan Goodman (Piatkus, 1990), also included material from the original police files and the remaining fragments of Faithfull's diary. Reviewer Paul Nigol of the University of Calgary called The Passing of Starr Faithfull "the most complete account" of the case because Goodman was the only author to have been granted full access to the police dossier. Goodman won the 1990 Crime Writers' Association Gold Dagger Award for Non-Fiction for his book.

Starr Faithfull's case has also been frequently discussed in social histories focusing on New York City or Boston, as well as true crime anthologies. The following is a selective list of books containing substantial discussions of the case.

- Murder Won't Out by Russel Crouse (Doubleday, Doran, 1932)
- Woman in the Case by Charles Franklin (Corgi, 1964)
- Open Files: A Narrative Encyclopedia of the World's Greatest Unsolved Crimes by Jay Robert Nash (Rowman & Littlefield, 1983)
- The Knave of Boston and Other Ambiguous Massachusetts Characters by Francis Russell (Quinlan Press, 1987)
- Big Town, Big Time: A New York Epic, 1898–1998, New York Daily News, edited by Jay Maeder (Sports Publishing, Inc., 1999)

=== Other ===
Starr Faithfull's unsolved death was the subject of a 1993 episode of the Granada Television true-crime series In Suspicious Circumstances, entitled "Falling Starr" (Season 3, Episode 5).

Linda Ann Loschiavo's 2004 play Courting Mae West, about actress Mae West's 1927 trial on morals charges in New York City, includes a character named Sara Starr who is based on Starr Faithfull.
