= Elizabeth Appleton =

1963 novel by John O'Hara

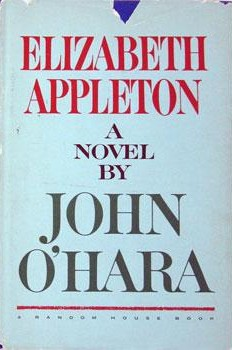
- First ed. cover
- Author: John O'Hara
- Language: English
- Publisher: Random House
- Publication date: 1963 (first edition)
- Publication place: United States
- Media type: Print
- Pages: 310 p.
- OCLC: 5663586

Elizabeth Appleton is a novel by John O'Hara written in 1960 and first published in 1963. The story is set mostly in Pennsylvania, and the time of the narrative stretches from the early 1930s to 1950. As in earlier novels, O'Hara minutely chronicles small-town life in America in the first half of the 20th century, especially its social and sexual mores.

== Plot ==
The title character is a woman from a wealthy New York family who, at a young age, marries a scholar of modest means. They move to his hometown in Pennsylvania, where he becomes a history professor and later a college dean. Several years into the marriage, after having two children, she embarks on a passionate but extremely secret love affair with a wealthy and affable local man.

== Commercial success ==
The novel appeared in Publishers Weekly's list of the top ten best-selling fiction works in the United States in the year 1963.

== In popular culture ==
In the first season tv-series Julia, Avis DeVoto is seen reading the book in the episode "Foie Gras".
