= Ten North Frederick (film) =

1958 film by Philip Dunne

- Film poster
- Directed by: Philip Dunne
- Screenplay by: Philip Dunne
- Based on: Ten North Frederick; 1955 novel by John O'Hara
- Produced by: Charles Brackett
- Starring: Gary Cooper; Geraldine Fitzgerald; Diane Varsi
- Cinematography: Joseph MacDonald
- Edited by: David Bretherton
- Music by: Leigh Harline
- Distributed by: 20th Century Fox
- Release date: May 22, 1958
- Running time: 102 minutes
- Country: United States
- Language: English
- Budget: $1,550,000
- Box office: $2 million

Ten North Frederick is a 1958 American drama film in CinemaScope written and directed by Philip Dunne and starring Gary Cooper. The screenplay is based on the 1955 novel of the same name by John O'Hara.

== Plot ==
In April 1945, outside the titular address in the fictional town of Gibbsville, Pennsylvania, a radio reporter is describing the funeral of distinguished attorney Joseph Chapin (Gary Cooper). While his shrewish wife Edith (Geraldine Fitzgerald) delivers his eulogy, daughter Ann (Diane Varsi) thinks back to Joe's fiftieth birthday celebration five years earlier.

Via a flashback, we learn rebellious ne'er-do-well son Joby (Ray Stricklyn) has been expelled from boarding school and wants to pursue a career as a jazz musician, a decision Edith feels will harm the family's reputation. The ambitious woman is determined to get Joe elected Lieutenant Governor, and she uses her wealth, political connections, and social influence to achieve her goal.

Threatening this ambition is Ann's secret marriage to trumpet player Charley Bongiorno (Stuart Whitman), who seduced and impregnated the naïve girl.

Corrupt power broker Mike Slattery (Tom Tully) and district attorney Lloyd Williams (Philip Ober) intervene. They threaten to charge Charley with statutory rape if he refuses to accept their bribe and agree to an annulment. Shortly after, Ann suffers a miscarriage, and when she learns her father condoned the deal that drove her husband away, she leaves home and moves to New York City.

Fearing repercussions from Ann's situation, party leaders refuse to back Joe in the election. He withdraws from the race, much to Edith's dismay. Angry with her husband, she reveals she once had an affair with Lloyd and bitterly tells him she wasted her life ministering to a failure.

Deeply depressed by the turn of events, Joe begins to drink heavily. On a business trip, he meets Ann's roommate, model Kate Drummond (Suzy Parker). The two fall into a relationship, and during a weekend getaway Joe presents her with a ruby, a Chapin family heirloom.

When the young woman's friends mistake Joe for her father, he realizes that he's unable to handle their huge age difference and ends the affair.

Joe's alcoholism takes its toll on his health but he refuses medical attention. Learning her father is dying, Ann returns home. Joe asks her about Kate. She tells him her roommate is about to wed, although she suspects Kate is in love with another man. Just before he dies, Joe realizes the man is himself.

At the funeral, Joby angrily accuses Slattery of betrayal and Edith of being responsible for Joe's decline. Later, just prior to Kate's wedding, Ann is helping her friend pack when she finds the ruby. She realizes her father was Kate's true love and that he experienced a brief period of happiness during his final years.

== Cast ==
- Gary Cooper as Joseph Chapin
- Geraldine Fitzgerald as Edith Chapin
- Diane Varsi as Ann Chapin
- Ray Stricklyn as Joby Chapin
- Suzy Parker as Kate
- Tom Tully as Mike Slattery
- Philip Ober as Lloyd Williams
- Stuart Whitman as Charley Bongiorno
- Linda Watkins as Peg Slattery
- John Emery as Paul Donaldson
- Barbara Nichols as Stella
- Melinda Byron as Hope

== Production ==
=== Original novel ===
The novel was published in 1955. The New York Times wrote that "the whole country will be reading... [it] this winter... it is the most challenging novel of the year." The Los Angeles Times called it "extraordinary."

The book became a best seller.

The book was later banned by Detroit police.

=== Development ===
O'Hara originally set a price of $500,000 for the film rights in December, 1955. In April 1956 he sold it to 20th Century Fox for $300,000. O'Hara then entered into a screenwriting contract with the studio, to do three scripts over three years working on The Best Things in Life Are Free and The Bravados.

The movie was assigned to Phillip Dunne to write and direct. "I thought it was O'Hara's best novel", said Dunne. "I thought it had great compassion in it."

Dunne decided to focus his script on Joe Chapin's affair with his daughter's friend which only took up a few pages of the novel. He decided to make that the centrepiece of the script and have everything build up to and flow on from that. In the original novel Joe's daughter has an abortion but this was changed in the script to a miscarriage due to censorship concerns.

Dunne went to Sun Valley to shoot second unit footage in April 1957, before any lead roles had been cast.

=== Casting ===
That month Spencer Tracy was cast as Joseph Chapin. This meant filming, originally scheduled for May, was pushed back until October so Tracy could appear in The Old Man and the Sea.

Because of Tracy's repeated teaming with Katharine Hepburn, the film's producer Charles Brackett announced he was enthusiastic about casting Hepburn as his wife.

In May 1957, model-actress Suzy Parker told the press in an interview: "If I'm good in Kiss Them for Me with Cary Grant, Buddy Adler is going to give me a very good role in 10 North Frederick with Spencer Tracy.

Parker was eventually cast, which, according to insiders, did not satisfy Tracy, who left the production in November 1957. Tracy dismissed these rumours, saying:

"I don't even know her. The real reason I didn't want to make the picture is because, at long last, John Ford is getting ready to produce The Last Hurrah, the life of James Michael Curley, and I waited so long to get John and to do this story, which I want to do more than anything else. So, I couldn't run the risk of starting one picture and losing John Ford."

Gary Cooper replaced Tracy in late November 1957. This meant the Cooper-starring Man of the West had to be postponed.

Dunne says, "Gary Cooper jumped at it, saying, 'I've lived in that guy's shoes.' He'd had a long affair with Patricia Neal before deciding to return to his wife. John O'Hara said it was the only decent movie adaptation of one of his books, although I only used a quarter of his plot."

That month Geraldine Fitzgerald agreed to come out of retirement to play Cooper's wife.

Shortly after, Diane Varsi was cast as his daughter.

=== Shooting ===
Filming started in late November 1957.

On December 23, Varsi suffered a nervous breakdown, and following a collapse on the set, she was hospitalized for a week.

It was an early key role for Stuart Whitman.

== Critical reception ==
In his review in The New York Times, Bosley Crowther wrote that the film "has been so sharply reduced in scope from what it was in the novel and the backgrounds of its people have been so pruned that it fails to explain the whys of their troubles, into the middle of which we're suddenly thrown. This appears to be the fault of the writer-director, Philip Dunne. He has tried to do too much with visual shorthand . . . He barely introduces his hero . . . before he is bouncing us through three disappointments in the fellow's fifty-first year and then having him meet a beautiful model for a brief and futile fling at romance . . . The production has class and distinction in black-and-white CinemaScope, but the drama itself lacks those virtues."

According to Variety: "The screen telling of the John O'Hara novel sacrifices detail and explanation at some loss to audience satisfaction."

TV Guide awarded it 2½ out of a possible four stars and called it "a confusing movie from a complex book with a performance by Cooper that almost manages to save the story."

Dunne said O'Hara liked the movie, although he thought Geraldine Fitzgerald was too beautiful to play the wife.

== Awards ==
Ten North Frederick was named Best Feature Film at the Locarno International Film Festival.

== See also ==
- List of American films of 1958

== Notes ==
- McGilligan, Patrick (1986). Backstory: Interviews with Screenwriters of Hollywood's Golden Age. University of California Press.
