= A Family Party =

1956 novelette by John O'Hara

- Author: John O'Hara
- Language: English
- Genre: novel
- Publisher: Random House
- Publication date: 1956
- Publication place: United States
- Media type: Print (hard & paperback)
- Pages: 80
- ISBN: 9780586023969

A Family Party, published in 1956, is a novella by American writer John O'Hara (1905–1970). It is the story of the public life of small town doctor Samuel G. Merritt of Lyons, Pennsylvania (O'Hara's fictionalized version of Lykens, Pennsylvania), with glimpses into his private life, presented as a stenographic report of a speech given by his best friend, Albert W. Shoemaker, at a testimonial dinner honoring Dr. Merritt's fortieth anniversary as a working doctor.

== Title ==
The title is taken from the text of the book, in which Mr. Shoemaker refers to the testimonial dinner as "what you might call a family party". This implied level of intimacy at an otherwise formal event is essential to the novelette's shocking shift in tone from sentimental and saccharine to deeply personal, as painful details of Merritt's life become revealed.

== Plot ==
The novelette takes the form of an address presented in its entirety, beginning with notes explaining the circumstance of the dinner. It takes place on September 17, 1955, on the occasion of 40 years of Dr. Samuel G. Merritt's service to the town of Lyons, PA. More than 200 people are in attendance. The affair is sponsored by over twenty social groups, including local chapters of Kiwanis, Knights of Columbus and Rotary International, and twenty other social groups, and the Lyons High School Orchestra performs, indicating Dr. Merritt's high regard throughout the town.

Alfred W. Shoemaker, publisher of the town newspaper delivers the remarks. He begins with explaining his lifelong connection with Dr. Merritt and their relationship as best friends. He recounts the doctor's heroic service at a long-ago train disaster at a nearby colliery in which 14 people were killed with more injured, many of them saved by Dr. Merritt's attention.

Shoemaker goes on to acknowledge events in Merritt's life that steered him toward medicine, notably the death of his older brother while a midshipman at the United States Naval Academy, and the influence of the town's pharmacist and doctor, who were his mentors.

The speech proceeds into topics that would not normally be considered polite conversation. Shoemaker explains how when Merritt started as a doctor, the nearest hospitals were far away over difficult roads, causing many patients to needlessly die. After the 1918 flu pandemic, Merritt became passionately committed to raising funds for a hospital in Lyons. After donating his savings and raising money from his family and others in Lyons, his efforts were frustrated by a coal strike and interference from the coal industry. This led to the hospital being diverted Johnsville, 8 miles away, under another doctor's supervision. Yet Merritt did not withhold his financial support and persuaded contributors to maintain their contributions, supporting what was best for the community despite his dream being thwarted.

The book reaches its climax when Shoemaker turns to the topic of Dr. Merritt's wife Alice. Alice isn't present at the dinner, which comes as an initial surprise. Shoemaker forthrightly tells the sad story of Alice, who after losing two children at birth suffered from Postpartum depression, and seriously injured herself attempting suicide. She has been institutionalized for the last 25 years. Shoemaker announces that the funds raised from the testimonial dinner will be contributed to the Johnsville hospital to have the maternity ward named for Alice Merritt.

== Critical reception ==
A Family Party is unusual because of its narrative structure, and its short length. It was originally published as a long short story in Collier's, and then issued in book format. It went through four printings and was released as a Bantam paperback.
