= BUtterfield 8 =

1960 film by Daniel Mann

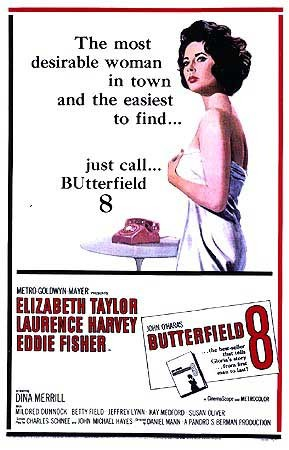
- Theatrical release poster by Reynold Brown
- Directed by: Daniel Mann
- Screenplay by: Charles Schnee; John Michael Hayes
- Based on: BUtterfield 8 by John O'Hara
- Starring: Elizabeth Taylor; Laurence Harvey; Eddie Fisher; Dina Merrill; Mildred Dunnock; Betty Field; Jeffrey Lynn; Kay Medford; Susan Oliver
- Cinematography: Joseph Ruttenberg, A.S.C.; Charles Harten, A.S.C.
- Edited by: Ralph E. Winters, A.C.E.
- Music by: Bronislau Kaper
- Production companies: An Afton-Linebrook Picture; A Pandro S. Berman Production
- Distributed by: Metro-Goldwyn-Mayer
- Release dates: November 2, 1960 (Paramount Theatre, Los Angeles)
- Running time: 109 minutes
- Country: United States
- Language: English
- Budget: $2.8 million
- Box office: $10 million

BUtterfield 8 is a 1960 American drama film directed by Daniel Mann, starring Elizabeth Taylor and Laurence Harvey. Taylor won her first Academy Award for her performance in a leading role. The film was based on a 1935 novel of the same name by John O'Hara.

== Plot ==
Gloria Wandrous wakes up in the apartment of wealthy executive Weston Liggett, and finds that he has left her $250. Insulted, she finds her dress was torn, and takes Liggett's wife Emily's mink coat to cover herself, scrawling "No Sale" in lipstick on the mirror. She orders her telephone answering service, BUtterfield 8, to put Liggett through if he calls.

Gloria visits a childhood friend, pianist Steve Carpenter, who chastises her for wasting her life on one-night stands, but agrees to ask his girlfriend Norma to lend her a dress. Norma later tells Steve he must choose between Gloria and her.

Liggett takes a train to the countryside, where his wife Emily is caring for her mother. His friend, Bingham Smith, advises him to end his adulterous relationships and return to Bing's law firm, instead of working for his father-in-law's chemical business. Meanwhile, Gloria lies to her mother Annie, claiming to have spent the night at Norma's.

Liggett returns home. Finding the lipstick and money, he phones Gloria to explain the money was meant for her to buy a new dress, to replace the one that he had torn. While drinking later that night, Liggett advises her to ask a high price for her lovemaking talents. She insists she does not take payment from her dates, and claims she has been hired as a model to advertise the dress she is wearing at three bistros that night. Liggett follows Gloria, watching her flirt with various men at several clubs. He drives her to a run-down motel. After sleeping together, Liggett and Gloria decide to explore their relationship further. They spend five days together, eventually falling in love with one another. They part only after Liggett's wife Emily returns.

Returning home, Gloria confesses to her mother about having been the "slut of all time", but declares that that is all over now, since she is truly in love. Gloria visits her psychiatrist, Dr. Tredman, to insist that her relationship with Liggett has cured her of promiscuity.

For his part, Liggett also plans to change his life, taking up Bing's offer of a job at the law firm. When he returns home, Emily has noticed that her mink is gone. Liggett makes excuses and rushes out to search for Gloria at her regular clubs. He cannot locate her, but in his search, he is repeatedly confronted with the reality of Gloria's promiscuous past. When Gloria finds Liggett at a bistro the following evening, he drunkenly launches into insults. Gloria drives Liggett to his apartment building where Emily, spotting them from a window, watches as her husband throws the coat at Gloria, saying he would never give the tainted object back to his wife.

Heartbroken, Gloria goes to Steve, saying that she feels she has "earned" the mink coat she is wearing. Having never before taken payment from the men she slept with, she now has and laments "what that makes me". She recounts that when she was 13, a friend of her widowed mother, Major Hartley, taught her about "evil". She hates herself because she loved it and thus went on to make her life out of it. Steve insists that Gloria stay the night, since both Gloria and he have to decide what to do next. Norma arrives the next morning, finding Gloria asleep on Steve's couch; having at last made up his mind, he asks Norma to marry him.

The next day, a now-sober Liggett admits to himself that he still loves Gloria and asks Emily for a divorce. Meanwhile, Gloria tells her mother she is moving to Boston to begin a new life.

Upon discovering Gloria's destination, Liggett drives until spotting her car at a roadside café. He tries to apologize by asking Gloria to marry him, but she insists that his insults have "branded" her and that her past is a sore spot that no husband would ever truly be able to accept. They profess their love for each other, and though Gloria initially agrees to go with Liggett to the motel, she ultimately changes her mind and flees in her car. Pursuing Gloria's car, Liggett sees her miss a sign for road construction and accidentally hurtle over an embankment to her death. Returning to the city, Liggett tells his wife about Gloria's death, announces that he is leaving to "find my pride", and says that if Emily is still home when he returns, they will see if it has any value to them.

== Cast ==
- Elizabeth Taylor as Gloria Wandrous
- Laurence Harvey as Weston Liggett
- Eddie Fisher as Steve Carpenter
- Dina Merrill as Emily Liggett
- Mildred Dunnock as Mrs. Wandrous
- Betty Field as Mrs. Francis Thurber, friend of Mrs. Wandrous
- Jeffrey Lynn as Bingham Smith
- Kay Medford as Happy
- Susan Oliver as Norma
- George Voskovec as Dr. Tredman

== Title ==
The title of the novel and film "BUtterfield 8" is the number of a telephone exchange for an answering service that follows the pattern of old telephone exchange names in the United States and Canada. Before all-number calling was common, telephone exchanges were referred to by name instead of by number. BUtterfield 8 was an exchange that provided service to upper-class neighborhoods of Manhattan's Upper East Side. Dialing the letters "BU" equates to 28 on the lettered telephone dial, so "BUtterfield 8" would equate to 288 as the first three digits of a seven-digit phone number.

The preface to the novel is a notice by the telephone company that an extra digit will be added to all exchanges, "for instance, the exchange BUtterfield will become BUtterfield 8."

== Production ==
=== Casting ===
Elizabeth Taylor did not want to appear in BUtterfield 8, which she and husband Eddie Fisher called "Butterball Four", and made the film only to fulfill a contractual obligation to Metro-Goldwyn-Mayer before being allowed to depart to 20th Century Fox to make Cleopatra.

In an archival audiotape played during the 2024 documentary film Elizabeth Taylor: The Lost Tapes, Taylor recalled her disdain for the film:

I hated it so much. I thought, "fuck them!"—they made me do the film. I didn't want to. I did it with a pistol at my head. The lines were so diabolical. It was such a piece of shit. And it made me angry. And out of the anger, it kind of gave me an incentive. ... It was done out of anger.

=== Screenplay ===
The screenplay was adapted by John Michael Hayes and Charles Schnee from O'Hara's 1935 novel, which in turn was based on the mysterious death of Starr Faithfull in Long Beach, New York, in 1931. Faithfull was found dead of drowning on a beach after having apparently been beaten. In O'Hara's novel, Gloria Wandrous, the character based on Faithfull, is killed by falling under the paddle wheel of a steamboat. Aside from optioning the rights to his story, O'Hara was not involved in writing the screenplay for the film, and the film's plot bears only a slight resemblance to his novel.

=== Filming ===
Location filming was done on City Island in the Bronx; and Stony Point and West Nyack in Rockland County, New York. Studio filming took place at Chelsea Studios in Manhattan.

The café where Liggett finds Gloria as she is going to Boston is an office building, 54 South (Liberty Drive), Stony Point. Happy's Motel, where Gloria and Liggett stay, is the Budget Motor Inn, 87 South Liberty Drive, Stony Point. Liggett takes Gloria to his boat at the Hudson Water Club, Beach Road, West Haverstraw, New York.

In his autobiography Been There, Done That, Fisher wrote that he and Taylor had sex during a lovemaking scene. The scene was cut from the film before its release.

== Release ==
=== Box office ===
According to MGM records, the film made $6.8 million in the US and Canada and $3.2 million in other countries, resulting in a profit to the studio of $1,857,000 and making it MGM's biggest hit of the year.

=== Critical reception ===
Bosley Crowther of The New York Times wrote that "we have the ancient, hackneyed story of the tinseled but tarnished prostitute who thinks she has finally discovered the silver lining for her life in Mr. Right … By the odds, it should be a bomb. But a bomb it is not, let us tell you … all we can say is that Miss Taylor lends a certain fascination to the film." Variety declared "The fact that it manages to be a reasonably arresting experience even though it is carved out of a highly questionable melodrama can be attributed to the keen sense of visual excitement possessed by those who pooled their talents to put it on the screen … The picture's major asset, dramatically as well as financially, is Miss Taylor, who makes what is becoming her annual bid for an Oscar."

John L. Scott of the Los Angeles Times wrote that although the material had a "somewhat flimsy narrative" and "Harvey seems miscast," Taylor gave a "daring, brilliant performance" and "gains another chance to be nominated for an Oscar." Richard L. Coe of The Washington Post called it an "immensely handsome but painfully shallow film" with Taylor its "redeeming feature." Harrison's Reports wrote "Elizabeth Taylor is magnificent in her portrayal of the model, while Laurence Harvey makes an ideal playboy whose vice-presidency in his wife's family's company calls only for his entertaining of customers. The script is ultra-frank. A big minus is Eddie Fisher, whose Thespian inability harms the otherwise brilliantly acted production." The Monthly Film Bulletin stated "In this case, the mixture resolutely refuses to come to the boil, due mainly to an inadequate script and theatrical, styleless direction. None of the players is able to sustain interest in the unending stream of smart talk and literary wisecracks and Elizabeth Taylor and Laurence Harvey, in particular, strive for an intensity which only leads to bathos."

The film holds a score of 47% on Rotten Tomatoes, based on 17 reviews.

=== Accolades ===
| Award | Category | Nominee(s) | Result |
|---|---|---|---|
| Academy Awards | Best Actress | Elizabeth Taylor | Won |
| Academy Awards | Best Cinematography – Color | Joseph Ruttenberg and Charles Harten | Nominated |
| Bambi Awards | Best Actress – International | Elizabeth Taylor | Nominated |
| Golden Globe Awards | Best Actress in a Motion Picture – Drama | Elizabeth Taylor | Nominated |
| Laurel Awards | Top Female Dramatic Performance | Elizabeth Taylor | Nominated |
| Laurel Awards | Top Female Supporting Performance | Dina Merrill | Nominated |

In 2005, the American Film Institute nominated Gloria Wandrous's quote "Mama, face it. I was the slut of all time" from this film for AFI's 100 Years...100 Movie Quotes.

== See also ==
- List of American films of 1960
