= Hope of Heaven =

1938 Novel by John O'Hara

- Author: John O'Hara
- Language: English
- Genre: Fiction
- Published: 1938
- Publisher: Harcourt, Brace & World
- Publication place: USA
- Pages: 182

Hope of Heaven is a 1938 novel by John O'Hara. It tells the story of struggling screenwriter in his mid-30s, living in Hollywood, who becomes besotted with an idealistic, younger woman, who doesn't fully reciprocate. Her estranged father, in town on business, complicates matters. The book is considered a work of hard-boiled noir. The screenwriter in the story is John Malloy, O'Hara's frequent fictional alter ego.
