= Ourselves to Know =

1960 novel by John O'Hara

Ourselves To Know
- Author: John O'Hara
- Language: English
- Genre: novel
- Publisher: Random House
- Publication place: United States
- Media type: Print (hard & paperback)
- Pages: 404
- ISBN: 0-394-43959-7

Ourselves To Know, published in 1960, is the tenth novel by American writer John O'Hara (1905–1970). It tells the life story of Robert Millhouser, an aspiring painter in youth who retreats into a life of reserved bachelorhood, but marries a much-younger woman in middle age and murders her in an act of domestic violence. Told over a period of many years stretching from the American Civil War through the 1920s, it is set in a fictional small town that is a loosely veiled representation of Lykens, Pennsylvania. The book was controversial due to O'Hara's inclusion of sexual material.

It was the #5 bestselling novel in the United States in the year 1960, as determined by Publishers Weekly.

== Plot ==
The novel is told from the point of view of Gerald Higgins. On visits to his grandparents in the fictional small town of Lyons, PA as a young child in the early 1920s, he's aware of a wealthy neighbor treated with an unusual reserve. When he'd ask about the man, he was told his name was Robert Millhouser. As he gets older he learns Millhouser was once convicted of murdering his wife in 1907, though discussion of the matter is taboo. A few years later at his grandfather's funeral, he encounters Millhouser and the two strike up an unlikely friendship. Robert agrees to correspond with Gerald at college to share his life story. The revelation of Millhouser's life and the hidden story of the murder emerges over years of correspondence and occasional visits.

The first part of the book relates background material from Millhouser's youth. Notable are the childhood memories of the Civil War, which reveal darker aspects of war than the patriotic legends Gerald was raised on. Millhouser's travels in Europe after college graduation in the late 1870s, ostensibly to paint and study art, yield a different sort of education as he very slowly realizes Chester Calthorp, his fraternity brother and traveling partner is exploring the gay subcultures of London, Paris, and Rome much more than the art scene.

In disgust, Millhouser returns to Lyons and takes up management of his late father's farm rental properties. He settles into an orderly life at home with his mother and servants, punctuated by regular visits to sex workers at brothels in nearby Fort Penn, a fictionalized version of Harrisburg, Pennsylvania. In his thirties, a courtship with a Fort Penn woman leads to an engagement, but it is quickly undermined by her parents.

But at the age of 50, when a mining executive moves to Lyons with his family, Robert is captivated by their daughter, Hedwig (Hedda) Steele, only 17 years old. Through the guise of painting her portrait, Robert seduces Hedda in a plot that is subtly encouraged by her parents, who are unsure of their ability to contain their sexually adventurous daughter. One year later they are married. The age difference is scandalous, but tolerated by society because of Robert's wealth and civic leadership role as bank president.

Millhouser is willingly swayed by his beautiful young wife, and she persuades him to leave Lyons for Fort Penn, with its relatively more cosmopolitan social life. Her sexual indiscretions lead to scandal. When the gossip works its way back to Millhouser he confronts Hedda. Her taunting behavior and plan to leave the marriage lead him to murder her by shooting her in a clearly premeditated manner.

Millhouser is jailed and loses all will to live while awaiting trial. He is visited in jail by Calthorp, who has renounced his libertine lifestyle, his homosexual orientation, converted to Roman Catholicism, and is now living a simple life as a monk. Robert is influenced by his old friend. His lawyer takes advantage of societal attitudes that consider murder justifiable in the face of marital infidelity by women. He has charges dropped to manslaughter, and the sentence suspended. Millhouser returns to Lyons as a free man, but spends his days living in isolation, his own version of the monastic lifestyle.
