= Ten North Frederick =

1955 novel by John O'Hara

First edition cover (publ. Random House, 1955)

Ten North Frederick is a novel by John O'Hara, published by Random House in 1955. It tells the story of Joseph Chapin, an ambitious man who desires to become president of the United States, and his relationships with his patrician wife, two rebellious children, and mistress.

Ten North Frederick won the 1956 National Book Award for Fiction. It was also a commercial success, ranking as one of the top ten best-selling books in the United States in Publishers Weekly's list for the year 1955.

In 1958, it was adapted into a film of the same name starring Gary Cooper as Chapin.
