= Vannie Higgins =

American mobster

Charles "Vannie" Higgins (1897 – June 19, 1932) was a New York mobster and one of the most prominent bootleggers during the Prohibition era. Known as "Brooklyn's Last Irish Boss", Higgins was notorious for his ability to escape conviction for the crimes for which he was charged.

== Early life and Prohibition ==
Higgins was born in the Bay Ridge section of Brooklyn, New York in 1897. Learning pickpocketing and petty theft as a child, by 1916, he had been arrested for assault twice but was put on probation. At the beginning of Prohibition he had formed a small-time gang which started to operate outside of Bay Ridge after taking control of "Big Bill" Bill Dwyer's bootlegging operations with partner Frank Costello in 1927, importing high quality Canadian liquor for Dwyer's high-society clientele.

By the mid-1920s, Higgins' rum-running operations included a fleet of taxis and loading trucks, as well as several planes and numerous speedboats which were used in smuggling alcohol into the United States from Canada (one of which, the Cigarette, was described as "the fastest rum-runner in New York waters"). Higgins, himself a flying enthusiast and licensed pilot, often used his planes for personal use.

During a business trip in Baltimore, Higgins was a witness to a gang fight between rival bootleggers while visiting a local speakeasy. When he decided to leave the premises, he was mistaken for one of the fighting bootleggers and shot in the leg by a local police officer.

== Manhattan bootleg wars ==
Higgins soon began moving into Manhattan, where he would come into conflict with Dutch Schultz. During the Manhattan Beer War, Higgins aligned himself with Jack "Legs" Diamond, Vincent "Mad Dog" Coll, and Anthony "Little Augie Pisano" Carfano against Schultz.

Higgins, Bailey and another gunman were arrested several weeks later in connection with the death of Brooklyn bootlegger Samuel Orlando, identified by witnesses as the rival gangsters who had gunned Orlando down. By the time of his trial, however, none of the witnesses could be found and he was acquitted of all charges.

Several months later, Higgins and Bailey were shot at in an attempted drive-by shooting by rival gunmen, although the two, driving in another car at the time of the attack, were able to escape their pursuers. When Higgins acquired a shipment of grenades from a military arsenal, he and "Legs" Diamond used them against Schulz's speakeasies during their battles with the rival gangster.

Although almost always surrounded by bodyguards, Higgins had earned a reputation for recklessness in gang battles as his offices and residence were known to be well-stocked with weapons. Higgins reportedly stated "I don't let my boys take risks I don't take." at the scene of many gun battles between himself and Schultz during 1928. During one such incident, Higgins and gunman William "Bad Bill" Bailey were seen fleeing the scene after fighting rival gunmen at Brooklyn's Owl Head Cafe at 69th Street and Third Avenue in which a patrolman Daniel J Maloney was killed in the crossfire by fellow arriving police officers in March 1929.

A colorful character in public life, Higgins made public appearances and often posed for news photographers, as he dressed in expensive British imported suits and was driven around in various limousines. Enjoying extensive political protection from many of New York's politicians and public officials, Higgins was allowed to land his plane at the state prison of Comstock, New York, where he had dinner with childhood friend Warden Joseph H. Wilson. Although Wilson was criticized by then-New York Governor Franklin D. Roosevelt, Wilson maintained he had the right to entertain anyone he wanted.

In 1931, Higgins led his men into the Manhattan's Blossom Heath Inn on West 57th Street, where he visited the owner, Frank McManus, the brother of George "Hump" McManus, a suspect in the 1928 murder of Arnold Rothstein. When Higgins refused to leave, arguing with the owner over a shipment of beer and liquor, a fight broke out in which Higgins suffered serious knife wounds. Although taken to Polyclinic Hospital, Higgins refused to identify his attacker while recuperating.

Later that year, Higgins and Bailey were suspected in the death of Robert "Whitey" Benson, a member of Higgins' organization who was suspected of secretly working for rival Dutch Schultz and informing him on information regarding Higgins' organization, including details on liquor shipments. Although arrested for the murder, the two were once again acquitted due to lack of evidence.

== Death ==
On the night of June 18, 1932, after attending his daughter's tap dance recital at the Knights of Columbus clubhouse in Prospect Park, Higgins was gunned down in the street while trying to protect his 7-year-old daughter. He was taken to the Methodist Episcopal Hospital by a local patrolman and, despite police attempts to question him, Higgins refused to answer any questions regarding the shooting and died the following afternoon.

In his letters to Jack Conroy, Frank Mead mentions that Higgins was a second cousin: "A relative of mine (2nd. cousin), by name Vannie Higgins, was machine-gunned to death in Brooklyn when the syndicate got going good."

== Alleged involvement in the death of Starr Faithfull ==
In recent years another mysterious death has been ascribed to Higgins. The British criminal historian, Jonathan Goodman did a thorough study of the death of Starr Faithfull, whose body was found on the beach at Long Beach, Nassau County, New York, on 8 June 1931. Although Faithfull's cause of death was determined to be drowning, it was unclear whether the death was a homicide, suicide, or accident. As the weeks passed and the story was stripped by the newspapers, it turned out Starr's life was a tangle due to sexual mistreatment as a teenager by her mother's cousin, Mayor Andrew Peters of Boston. Peters (best recalled as the Mayor during the 1919 Boston Police Strike) kept the sexual relationship going for years, and paid the mother and stepfather of Starr money for their silence. Starr was also interested in other men, including a steamship physician, Dr. George Jameson Carr. But Carr appeared to be breaking the relationship off. So there was a strong possibility that Starr committed suicide.

Goodman discovered that Higgins had learned that Starr had an irregular sexual relationship with Peters, and her family had been extorting money from this Mayor. Goodman concluded that Higgins had Starr kidnapped and driven to Island Park, Long Island, where he tried to force her to divulge details of her affair with Peters. He was unsatisfied with her answers, and beat her. Thinking he had beaten her to death, he ordered the body dumped. However, Faithfull was still alive when she was thrown into the ocean, because her cause of death was drowning.
