= Pal Joey (musical) =

1940 Rodgers & Hart musical

- Studio cast album 1950
- Music: Richard Rodgers
- Lyrics: Lorenz Hart
- Book: John O'Hara
- Basis: John O'Hara's novel Pal Joey
- Productions: 1940 Broadway; 1952 Broadway revival 1954 West End; 1963 Broadway; 1976 Broadway revival 1980 West End revival 2008 Broadway revival

Pal Joey is a 1940 musical with a book by John O'Hara and music and lyrics by Richard Rodgers and Lorenz Hart. The musical is based on a character and situations O'Hara created in a series of short stories published in The New Yorker, which he later published in novel form. The title character, Joey Evans, is a manipulative small-time nightclub performer whose ambitions lead him into an affair with the wealthy, middle-aged and married Vera Simpson. It includes two songs that have become standards: "I Could Write a Book" and "Bewitched (Bothered And Bewildered)".

The original 1940 Broadway production was directed by George Abbott and starred Vivienne Segal and Gene Kelly. Though it received mixed reviews, the show ran for 10 months, the third-longest run of any Rodgers and Hart musical. There have been several revivals since, including a 2008–09 Broadway run, and a 1957 film adaptation starring Frank Sinatra, Rita Hayworth and Kim Novak.

== Background ==
Author John O'Hara offered his stories of Pal Joey to Rodgers and Hart for adaptation as a new musical. Title character Joey Evans, an unsympathetic but charming antihero, was a striking departure from the usual musical comedy formula. Joey was amoral, but he was not presented as a villain, nor did his character change for the better. Richard Rodgers said: "Joey was not disreputable because he was mean, but because he had too much imagination to behave himself, and because he was a little weak." Rodgers and Hart maintained a cynical, dark tone throughout the work and employed two distinct musical styles in the show: the deliberately tacky nightclub numbers contrasted with the more elegant songs the characters sang to express their emotions, though these expressions were more ironic than sincere. Hart's lyrics frankly described Joey and Vera's affair; "Bewitched, Bothered, and Bewildered" included (among others) the lyrics, "Horizontally speaking, he's at his very best" and "Vexed again, Perplexed again, Thank God I can be oversexed again", while "In Our Little Den (of Iniquity)" included, "We're very proper folks you know, We've separate bedrooms comme il faut. There's one for play and one for show".

As they cast the musical, Rodgers, Hart and O'Hara knew that they wanted Joey to be primarily a dancer, not a singer, and the actor who played Joey would have to be likeable in spite of Joey's unpleasant character. They chose Gene Kelly, who was at the time playing a dancing role, Harry the Hoofer, in the play The Time of Your Life. Kelly had made his Broadway debut in 1938 in the chorus of Cole Porter's Leave It to Me!; Pal Joey would be his first lead role. Rodgers and Hart wanted Vivienne Segal, who had previously starred in their 1938 musical I Married an Angel, to play the older woman with whom Joey has an affair; though O'Hara had initially considered other actresses, he was won over when he met Segal. Segal, who would be 43 when the show opened on Broadway, appreciated the opportunity to play a worldly, mature character, unlike the ingenues she had played for most of her career. Using Segal's initials, O'Hara gave her character the name "Vera Simpson". O'Hara was not present during the out-of-town tryouts, and director George Abbott took over the rewriting. When the show opened in New York, the critics were divided. Richard Watts (New York Herald Tribune) called it "brilliant", but other critics and some members of the theatre-going public disliked the subject matter. Nonetheless, it became the longest running Rodgers–Hart show up to that time.

== Synopsis ==
Based on original 1940 book

Act I

In Chicago in the late 1930s, singer/dancer Joey Evans, a charming "heel" with big plans, schemes to get his own nightclub. He auditions for an emcee job at a second-rate nightclub ("You Mustn't Kick It Around"). Joey gets the job and begins rehearsals with the chorus girls and club singer Gladys Bumps. Joey meets young and naïve Linda English outside a pet shop, and he impresses her with grandiose lies about his career. Linda innocently falls for Joey's line ("I Could Write a Book"). As the chorus girls are doing a song-and-dance number at the club that night ("Chicago"), Linda arrives with a date. Wealthy married socialite Vera Simpson arrives at the club and shows a definite interest in Joey. Joey plays hard-to-get and insults Vera, who walks out. Mike, the club owner, fires Joey, but Joey, believing Vera will be back, strikes a deal: if Vera doesn't come back within the next few days, Joey will leave without pay. The chorus girls continue with the show ("That Terrific Rainbow"); Linda, having witnessed Joey's caddish behavior, has left the club. Vera doesn't return, so Joey is fired. When Linda refuses to answer his calls, Joey calls Vera ("What is a Man"). After Joey's last night as emcee, Vera picks him up from the club and they start an affair ("Happy Hunting Horn"). Vera is glowing in the romance and sets Joey up with an apartment and expensive clothes ("Bewitched, Bothered and Bewildered"). While shopping for clothes for Joey, he and Vera run into Linda, leaving Vera jealous and Linda distraught. Vera gives Joey his own nightclub, "Chez Joey", and Joey looks forward to rising to the top ("Pal Joey"/"Joey Looks to the Future" ballet).

Act II

The chorus girls and singers from the old club have relocated to "Chez Joey", where they rehearse for the opening performance ("The Flower Garden of My Heart"). Melba, an ambitious reporter, interviews Joey, recalling her interviews with various celebrities—including Gypsy Rose Lee ("Zip"), especially notable since the original actor playing Gladys, June Havoc, was Lee's real-life sister. Ludlow Lowell, Gladys' old flame, introduces himself as an agent with papers that Joey unthinkingly signs as the rehearsal continues ("Plant You Now, Dig You Later"). In Joey's apartment the next morning, Joey and Vera reflect on the pleasures of their affair ("In Our Little Den"). Linda overhears Gladys and Lowell plotting to use the papers Joey signed to blackmail Vera. Linda calls Vera, who initially distrusts Linda; Vera confronts Joey, asking what his relationship is with Linda, and Joey responds defensively ("Do It the Hard Way"). Linda comes to the apartment to convince Vera, and Vera, seeing Linda's sincerity, now believes her. Vera and Linda agree that Joey is not worth the trouble ("Take Him"). Vera calls her friend the police commissioner, who arrests Gladys and Lowell. Vera throws Joey out and closes "Chez Joey" ("Bewitched, Bothered, and Bewildered" reprise). Joey, now penniless, runs into Linda again outside the pet shop, and she invites him to dinner with her family. He joins for a meal and then they part as friends, with him claiming to have been cast in a nonexistent show in New York.

=== Principal roles and notable performers ===
Character	Description	Notable performers
Joey Evans	A small-time womanizing MC and dancer/singer who has dreams of opening his own night club	Gene Kelly; Frank Sinatra; Harold Lang; Bob Fosse; Denis Lawson; Christopher Chadman; Clifton Davis; Joel Grey
Vera Simpson	A bored rich socialite	Vivienne Segal; Rita Hayworth; Siân Phillips; Viveca Lindfors; Joan Copeland; Lena Horne; Donna Murphy; Patti LuPone; Stockard Channing; Christine Andreas
Linda English	A naive stenographer (in the 2008 revival, a clerk in a men's clothing store)	Leila Ernst; Kim Novak; Daisy Prince
Gladys Bumps	A chorus girl who takes an instant dislike to Joey (in the 2008 revival, they have a history together)	June Havoc; Helen Gallagher; Barbara Nichols; Vicki Lewis; Martha Plimpton
Melba Snyder	An ambitious reporter (does not appear in the 2008 revival)	Jean Casto; Elaine Stritch; Kay Medford; Josephine Premice; Dixie Carter; Bebe Neuwirth; Ann Reinking
Ludlow Lowell	A crooked "artists' representative"	Jack Durant; Lionel Stander; Ned Eisenberg; Ron Perlman

== Musical numbers ==
Act I

- "You Mustn't Kick It Around" – Joey Evans, Gladys Bumps, Agnes, The Kid, Chorus Girls and Waiters
- "I Could Write a Book" – Joey and Linda English
- "Chicago" – Dancer and Chorus Girls
- "That Terrific Rainbow" – Gladys, Victor and Girls
- "What is a Man?" – Vera Simpson
- "Happy Hunting Horn" – Joey, Terry, Chorus Girls and Boy Friends
- "Bewitched, Bothered and Bewildered" – Vera Simpson
- "Pal Joey (What Do I Care For A Dame?)" – Joey

Act II

- "The Flower Garden of My Heart" – Gladys, The Tenor, Specialty Dancer and Ensemble
- "Zip" † – Melba Snyder
- "Plant You Now, Dig You Later" – Ludlow Lowell, Gladys and Ensemble
- "In Our Little Den (of Iniquity)" – Vera and Joey
- "Do It The Hard Way" – Ludlow, Gladys, Dancer and Ensemble
- "I Still Believe In You" † – Linda
- "Take Him" – Vera, Linda and Joey
- "Bewitched, Bothered, Bewildered" (Reprise) – Vera
- "I Still Believe In You" (Reprise) † – Linda
- "I'm Talkin' to My Pal" † – Joey
- "I Could Write A Book" (Reprise) – Joey

† 2008 revival: "Zip" is sung by Gladys; cut songs restored; Linda's reprise added

== Productions ==
=== Original Broadway production ===
Pal Joey premiered on Broadway on December 25, 1940, at the Ethel Barrymore Theatre and ran for 374 performances. Directed by George Abbott with choreography by Robert Alton, the opening-night cast included Gene Kelly as Joey, Vivienne Segal as Vera, and June Havoc as Gladys. Van Johnson and Stanley Donen were also in the cast.

=== 1952 Broadway revival ===
Pal Joey achieved wider acclaim in the decades after its initial production. Throughout much of the 1940s, the songs from Pal Joey were banned from radio play by ASCAP, preventing them from becoming popular standards; the ban was lifted in the late 1940s. In 1950, the song "Bewitched, Bothered and Bewildered" became popular and was recorded by various bands and pop singers, including Mel Torme, Doris Day, and Gordon Jenkins and The Harmonicats. Prompted by the song's success, Goddard Lieberson, the producer of Columbia Records, decided to produce a studio cast album of Pal Joey featuring Harold Lang as Joey and Vivienne Segal reprising her role as Vera. Because of the popularity of that recording, composer-producer Jule Styne produced the 1952 revival, in which Lang and Segal starred.

The 1952 revival met with greater success than the original production. It opened on January 3, 1952, and closed on April 18, 1953, after 540 performances. Lang and Segal starred, with Helen Gallagher as Gladys (for which Ms. Gallagher won the Tony Award for best featured actress that year), future Broadway star Elaine Stritch as Melba, Jack Waldron as Mike Spears, and Bob Fosse as the understudy for Joey. Dances and musical numbers were again staged by Robert Alton, and the production was directed by David Alexander. This production had the longest run of any revival of a musical in the history of the Broadway theatre at the time. It won the New York Drama Critics' Circle Award for Best Musical and became the first musical ever to receive eleven Donaldson Awards. Elaine Stritch was signed as an understudy to Ethel Merman in Call Me Madam at the time; she describes the difficulties of holding both jobs after the previews unexpectedly moved to New Haven in a monologue framed by "Zip" in her one-woman show Elaine Stritch at Liberty.

=== London ===
There have been two productions in London's West End. The first was in March 1954 at the Princes Theatre, starring Harold Lang, Carol Bruce and Sally Bazely. The second was at the Noël Coward Theatre, from September 1980 until September 1981, starring Siân Phillips, Danielle Carson, and Denis Lawson.

=== 1963 City Center revival ===
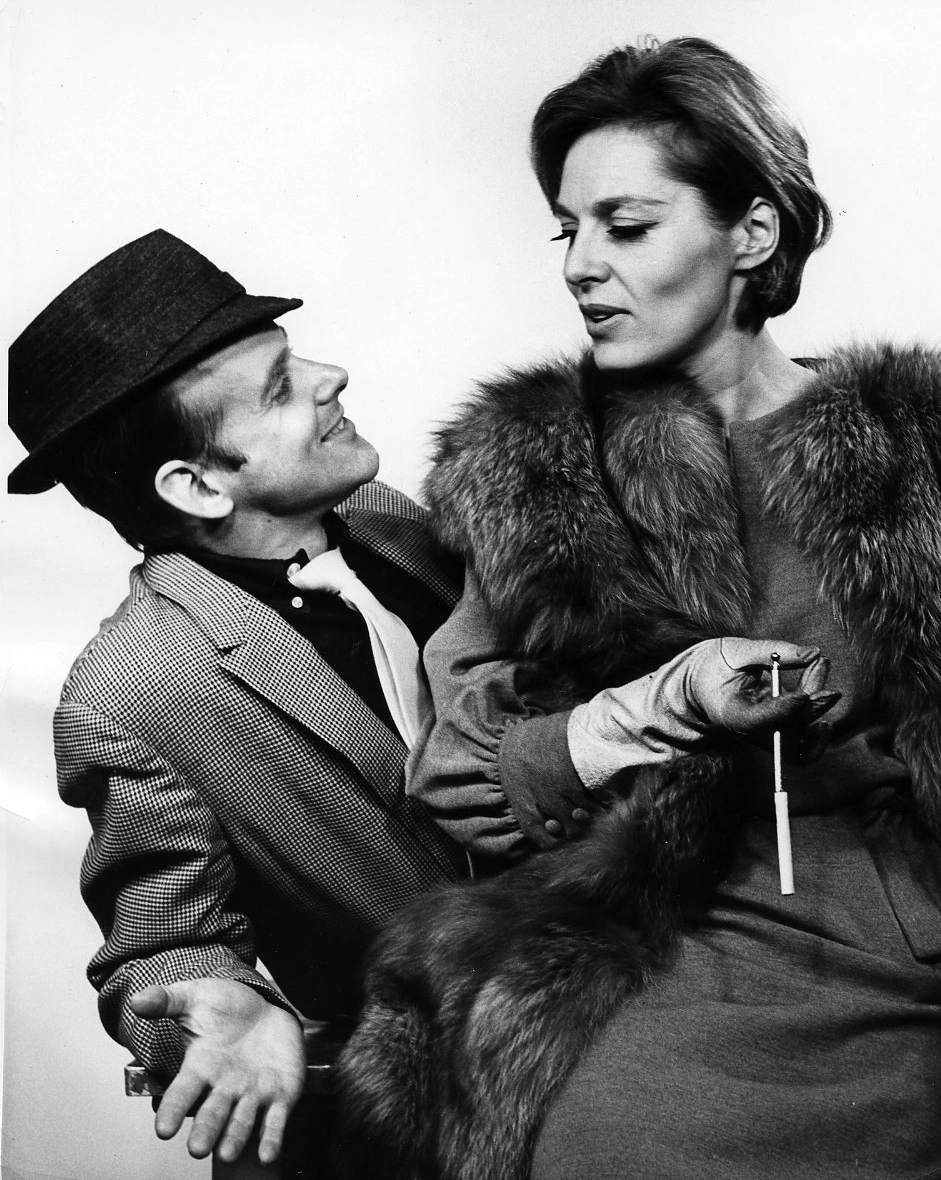
Bob Fosse and Viveca Lindfors in the 1963 Broadway revival of Pal Joey

Mounted at New York City Center, the production starred Bob Fosse as Joey Evans, Viveca Lindfors as Vera Simpson, Rita Gardner as Linda English, Elaine Dunn as Gladys Bumps, Kay Medford as Melba Snyder, and Jack Durant as Ludlow Lowell. While only running for 15 performances from May 29, 1963, to June 9, 1963, Fosse was nominated for a Tony Award for his performance. The production was directed by Gus Schirmer Jr., used sets by Howard Bay, and costumes by Frank Thompson.

=== 1976 Broadway revival ===
In 1976, a revival on Broadway opened on June 27, 1976, at the Circle in the Square Theatre and closed on August 29, 1976. The show was directed by Theodore Mann; choreography by Margo Sappington; musical direction/additional dance arrangements by Scott Oakley; scenery John J. Moore; costumes Arthur Boccia; lighting Ron Wallace; principal orchestrator Michael Gibson; production stage manager Randall Brooks; stage manager James Bernardi; and press by Merle Debusky and Susan L. Shulman.

The opening-night cast featured Christopher Chadman (Joey); Harold Gary (Mike); Terri Treas (Kid); Janie Sell (Gladys); Gail Benedict (Gail); Murphy Cross (Murphy); Rosamond Lynn (Rosamond); Marilu Henner (Marilu); Deborah Geffner (Debbie); Boni Enton (Linda); David Hodo (Gent); Austin Colyer (Ernest); Denny Martin Flinn (Waldo the Waiter); Michael Leeds (Victor); Kenn Scalice (Delivery Boy); Adam Petroski (Louis); Joe Sirola (Ludlow Lowell); Ralph Farnworth (O'Brien); Dixie Carter (Melba); and Joan Copeland (Vera). It ran for 73 performances.

=== Other productions, 1970s to 2000s ===
A 1978 revival titled 'Pal Joey '78' starring Clifton Davis as Joey, Lena Horne as Vera, and Josephine Premice as Melba was scrapped due to low ticket sales and critical pans during its tryout tour. The Huntington Theatre in Boston presented a revised version, adapted by Richard Greenberg and director David Warren, from September to October 1992. The cast featured Donna Murphy as Vera. A staged concert in the New York City Center Encores! series in May 1995 (and which first restored "I'm Talkin' to My Pal" to the score) starred Peter Gallagher and Patti LuPone. In 2002, there was a Prince Music Theater production in Philadelphia which starred Christine Andreas. The following year Andreas won the Barrymore Award for Outstanding Leading Actress in a Musical for her performance as Vera Simpson.

=== 2008 Broadway revival ===
Producer Marc E. Platt, along with Richard Greenberg (who had written the 1992 Boston adaptation) and director Joe Mantello planned a revival for fall 2007, which was postponed. The Roundabout Theatre Company and Platt presented a limited engagement, with previews beginning on November 14, 2008, officially opening on December 18, 2008, and closing on March 1, 2009. The original book by John O'Hara had undergone substantial "adaptation" by Greenberg, eliminating characters and reassigning songs. This new production also included a song for Joey that was cut prior to the 1940 Broadway premiere, "I'm Talkin' to My Pal" (first rediscovered and used in the 1995 Encores production and recording), and also interpolated two Rodgers & Hart songs, which were sung by Joey and Linda: "Are You My Love?" (from the 1936 film Dancing Pirate) and "I Still Believe in You" (from the 1930 musical Simple Simon). Mantello directed, with choreography by Graciela Daniele. The production starred Stockard Channing as Vera, Martha Plimpton as Gladys, Matthew Risch as Joey, Jenny Fellner as Linda, and Robert Clohessy as Mike. The set designer was Scott Pask, with costumes by William Ivey Long and lighting by Paul Gallo. Advance publicity for the show included a full page spread in the November issue of Vogue, featuring Christian Hoff in costume as Joey. Hoff began previews as Joey, but when he was forced to leave the production on November 22, 2008, due to an injury, his understudy, Matthew Risch, took over the part. Risch had previously appeared on Broadway in featured roles in Chicago and Legally Blonde.

=== 2023 City Center production ===
In May 2023, New York City Center announced that it would stage a production as its annual fall gala presentation. The production would feature a new book by Richard LaGravenese and Daniel Beaty, choreography by Savion Glover, and direction by Glover and Tony Goldwyn. Casting would feature Brooks Ashmanskas as Melvin, Loretta Devine as Lucille (replacing the originally announced Jennifer Holliday in a role newly created for this production due to scheduling conflicts), Aisha Jackson as Linda, Elizabeth Stanley as Vera, and Ephraim Sykes as Joey. The show ran for 7 performances from November 1 to 7, 2023.

== Critical response ==
=== Original and subsequent productions ===
In the 1940 New York Times review, Brooks Atkinson wrote:

If it is possible to make an entertaining musical comedy out of an odious story, Pal Joey is it. John O'Hara has written a joyless book about a sulky assignation. Under George Abbott's direction some of the best workmen on Broadway have fitted it out with smart embellishments. Pal Joey offers everything but a good time, whether Joey is a punk or a heel is something worth more careful thinking than time permits. Although Pal Joey is expertly done, can you draw sweet water from a foul well?

When he reviewed the 1952 revival, Atkinson called the production "brilliant", writing:

There is no sign of age in the brisk performance that Robert Alton has expertly staged; and the acting is sharp and original... Miss Segal presides over the sordid affairs of an astringent tale with humor, reserve, and charm. It would be hard to improve upon Harold Lang's performance as the heel.

In reviewing the 1995 Encores! concert, Vincent Canby noted:

Here was a show in which cynicism, sophistication, bogus sentimentality and high spirits were as much the content as the form of an otherwise traditional Broadway musical. The first production [1940] shocked a lot of critics and many theatergoers. There was no question about the quality of the Richard Rodgers score and Lorenz Hart lyrics. The disturbance was caused by John O'Hara's corrosive book: the sordid adventures of a Chicago nightclub singer and M.C. named Joey Evans. It wasn't until the 1952 revival that Joey was recognized as literature's latest darling, the antihero. In 1995, Pal Joey is a treasure.

=== 2008 production ===
The New York Times panned the 2008 production, describing it as "in mourning for its own lifelessness", having "no detectable pulse". Todd Haimes, the Artistic Director of the Roundabout Theatre, commented on the "new book by Richard Greenberg that, in my opinion, does a stunning job of enhancing O'Hara's original by more fully integrating the songs with the book and giving even more of a full life to each of his characters." The Times quoted Haimes as saying that he thought

the Greenberg adaptation transformed the original "flawed book" by enriching the dialogue and sharpening the characters of not only Joey but the women in his life, like the damaged society wife Vera Simpson... and the wronged chanteuse Gladys Bumps.... In other words, there would be a stronger story that might match the well-known songs.

According to New York,

Greenberg ... simplified the story and removed much of the old script's gangster gothic.... He made it smarter and sexier, and bleak. Where the movie ended with Novak and Sinatra walking off into the California sunshine, this ends with Joey alone on a dark street corner, wondering—like so many right now — what the hell to do."

Variety wrote:

The Rodgers and Hart songs...are certainly easy on the ear, but what makes the Roundabout revival of their 1940 show so compelling is Richard Greenberg's trenchant adaptation of the original book by John O'Hara. Erasing the sanitizing stamp of musical-theater coyness, Greenberg brings a fascinating melancholy grubbiness to this cynical story of sordid emotional transactions and opportunistic behavior in late-1930s Chicago.

The New York Post ("a flawed revival") gave the production 2½ stars.

The Associated Press wrote:

Richard Greenberg ... has given John O'Hara's original book ... a new sheen without changing the general outline of the story: punkish song-and-dance man scores big, gets his comeuppance but soldiers on. Greenberg's rewrite is crisp and to the point. There is a hard-boiled briskness to his work, a film-noir sensibility in its punchy dialogue that ricochets lickety-split across the stage.

Variety, praising the production and specifically Risch, wrote a follow-up response to the mixed reviews stating

it's bizarre to see Mantello's staging pejoratively described as "ruthless", "joyless" and "unhappy"—as if such qualities don't compute in musical theater. One of the controversies of this "Joey" is that its leading man, newcomer Matthew Risch, the understudy who replaced Christian Hoff in the eleventh hour, fails to deliver the requisite dollop of charm to his catting around. Reviewers have compared him with actors they never saw in the role, namely Gene Kelly, or men who have never essayed Joey onstage, including Hugh Jackman, Harry Connick Jr. and, yes, Frank Sinatra, who insisted, among other woeful ideas, that he sing "The Lady Is a Tramp" in the misconceived (and far happier) 1957 film version.

adding

Coincidence or not, Risch's Joey is a younger brother of Erwin Schrott's Don Giovanni, seen at the Met Opera earlier this season. When these guys smile, it's the devil's work at play with any woman's affections. If the show offers a pessimistic view of female sexuality, then so be it. Joey and Giovanni, not the women, are the ones going straight to hell.

and "In the end, Mantello and Risch's Joey is an easy antihero to understand, if not love."

=== Legacy ===
Looking retrospectively, musical theatre historian Ethan Mordden pronounced Pal Joey's book a "breakthrough in character writing". He stated that "the two leads and Linda are extremely well-drawn", and that though "Pal Joey is tough, period, its script is true to its characters, even as its characters hold true to its script". He also believed that the show "finds Rodgers and Hart at their best". Historians Everett and Laird wrote that Pal Joey is the "most important work produced by Rodgers and Hart", and is the "most integrated of their musicals".

== Awards and nominations ==
=== 1952 Broadway revival ===
Year	Award Ceremony	Category	Nominee	Result
1952	Tony Award	Best Performance by a Featured Actress in a Musical	Helen Gallagher	Won
1952	Tony Award	Best Choreography	Robert Alton	Won
1952	Tony Award	Best Conductor and Musical Director	Max Meth	Won
1952	Donaldson Award	Best Musical		Won
1952	Donaldson Award	Best Book of a Musical	John O'Hara	Won
1952	Donaldson Award	Best Leading Performance by an Actress	Vivienne Segal	Won
1952	Donaldson Award	Best Supporting Performance by an Actress	Helen Gallagher	Won
1952	Donaldson Award	Best Dancer in a Musical	Harold Lang	Won
1952	Donaldson Award	Best Director of a Musical	David Alexander	Won
1952	Donaldson Award	Best Dance Direction	Robert Alton	Won
1952	Donaldson Award	Best Original Score	Richard Rodgers	Won
1952	Donaldson Award	Best Lyrics	Lorenz Hart	Won
1952	Donaldson Award	Best Scenic Design	Oliver Smith	Won
1952	Donaldson Award	Best Costume Design	Miles White	Won
1952	New York Drama Critics' Circle Awards	Best Musical	Richard Rodgers, Lorenz Hart and John O'Hara	Won

=== 1963 City Center revival ===
Year	Award Ceremony	Category	Nominee	Result
1964	Tony Award	Best Performance by a Leading Actor in a Musical	Bob Fosse	Nominated

=== 1977 Broadway revival ===
Year	Award Ceremony	Category	Nominee	Result
1977	Drama Desk Award	Outstanding Actress in a Musical	Joan Copeland	Nominated

=== 1980 London revival ===
Year	Award Ceremony	Category	Nominee	Result
1980	Laurence Olivier Award	Best Actor in a Musical	Denis Lawson	Nominated
1980	Laurence Olivier Award	Best Actress in a Musical	Siân Phillips	Nominated

=== 2002 Philadelphia production ===
Year	Award Ceremony	Category	Nominee	Result
2003	Barrymore Award	Outstanding Leading Actress in a Musical	Christine Andreas	Won

=== 2008 Broadway revival ===
Year	Award Ceremony	Category	Nominee	Result
2009	Tony Award	Best Revival of a Musical		Nominated
2009	Tony Award	Best Performance by a Leading Actress in a Musical	Stockard Channing	Nominated
2009	Tony Award	Best Performance by a Featured Actress in a Musical	Martha Plimpton	Nominated
2009	Tony Award	Best Scenic Design	Scott Pask	Nominated
2009	Drama Desk Award	Outstanding Revival of a Musical		Nominated
2009	Drama Desk Award	Outstanding Actress in a Musical	Stockard Channing	Nominated
2009	Drama Desk Award	Outstanding Featured Actress in a Musical	Martha Plimpton	Nominated
2009	Outer Critics Circle Award	Outstanding Revival of a Musical		Nominated
2009	Outer Critics Circle Award	Outstanding Featured Actress in a Musical	Martha Plimpton	Nominated

== Recordings ==
The 1950 studio cast recording starring Vivienne Segal and Harold Lang was released by Columbia on February 12, 1951.

A partial cast recording of the 1952 Broadway revival was released in January 1952 by Capitol Records. It featured Helen Gallagher, Elaine Stritch and others from the revival cast, but starred non-cast members Jane Froman and Dick Beavers as Vera and Joey, in place of Segal and Lang.

A 1980 London Revival Cast recording was released on the TER Label/JAY Records, starring Denis Lawson and Siân Phillips.

A cast recording of the 1995 concert, starring Patti LuPone and Peter Gallagher, was released October 12, 1995 by DRG (ASIN: B000000PL1).
