= John O'Hara =

American novelist and short story writer (1905–1970)

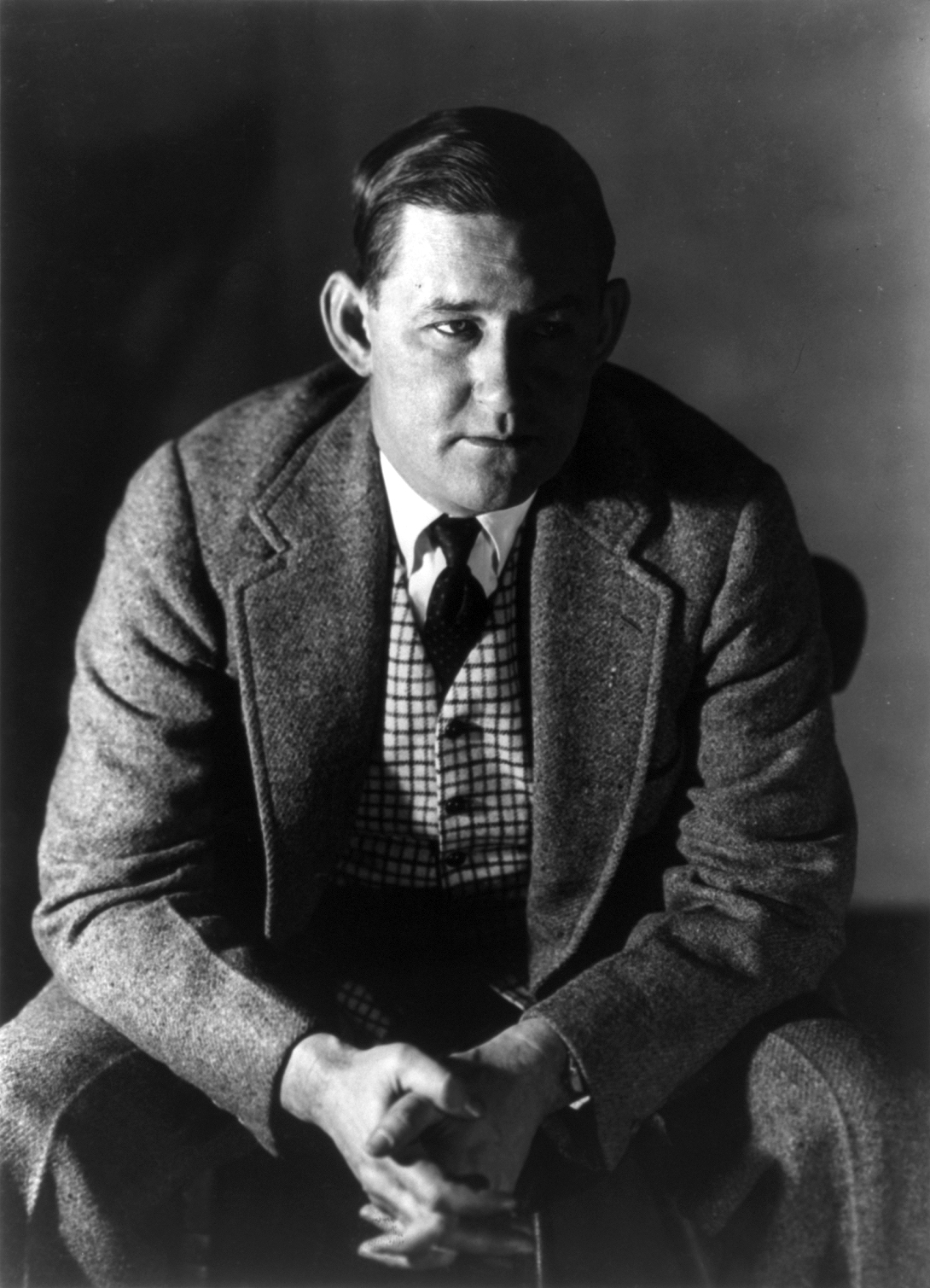
- O'Hara in 1945
- Born: January 31, 1905; Pottsville, Pennsylvania, U.S.
- Died: April 11, 1970 (aged 65); Princeton, New Jersey, U.S.
- Writing career
- Genres: Short story, drama, essay
- Notable works: Appointment in Samarra; BUtterfield 8

John Henry O'Hara (January 31, 1905 – April 11, 1970) was an American writer. He was one of America's most prolific writers of short stories, credited with helping to invent The New Yorker magazine short story style. He became a best-selling novelist before the age of 30 with Appointment in Samarra and BUtterfield 8. While O'Hara's legacy as a writer is debated, his work was praised by such contemporaries as Ernest Hemingway and F. Scott Fitzgerald, and his champions rank him highly among the major under-appreciated American writers of the 20th century. Few college students educated after O'Hara's death in 1970 have discovered him, chiefly because he refused to allow his work to be reprinted in anthologies used to teach literature at the college level.

"O’Hara may not have been the best story writer of the twentieth century, but he is the most addictive," wrote Lorin Stein, then editor-in-chief of The Paris Review, in a 2013 appreciation of O'Hara's work. Stein added, "You can binge on his collections the way some people binge on Mad Men, and for some of the same reasons. On the topics of class, sex, and alcohol—that is, the topics that mattered to him—his novels amount to a secret history of American life."

O'Hara achieved substantial commercial success in the years after World War II, when his fiction repeatedly appeared in Publishers Weekly's annual list of the top ten best-selling fiction works in the United States. These best sellers included A Rage to Live (1949), Ten North Frederick (1955), From the Terrace (1959), Ourselves to Know (1960), Sermons and Soda Water (1960) and Elizabeth Appleton (1963). Five of his works were adapted into popular films in the 1950s and 1960s.

Despite the popularity of these books, O'Hara accumulated detractors due to his outsized and easily bruised ego, alcoholic irascibility, long-held resentments and politically conservative views that were unfashionable in literary circles in the 1960s. After O'Hara's death, John Updike, an admirer of O'Hara's writing, said that the prolific author "out-produced our capacity for appreciation; maybe now we can settle down and marvel at him all over again."

== Early life and education ==
O'Hara was born in Pottsville, Pennsylvania, to an affluent Irish American family. Though his family lived among the gentry of eastern Pennsylvania during his childhood, O'Hara's Irish Catholic background gave him the perspective of an outsider to elite WASP society, a theme he wrote of again and again. He attended the secondary school Niagara Prep in Lewiston, New York, where he was named Class Poet for Class of 1924. His father died about that time, leaving him unable to afford Yale, the college of his dreams, and he fell overnight from the privileged life of a well-heeled doctor's family, including club memberships, riding and dance lessons, fancy cars in the barn, and domestic servants in the house. By all accounts, this social fall afflicted O'Hara with status anxiety for the rest of his life, honing the cutting social class awareness that characterizes his work.

Brendan Gill, who worked with O'Hara at the New Yorker, claimed that O'Hara was nearly obsessed with a sense of social inferiority due to not having attended Yale. "People used to make fun of the fact that O'Hara wanted so desperately to have gone to Yale, but it was never a joke to O'Hara. It seemed... that there wasn't anything he didn't know about it in regard to college and prep-school matters." Hemingway once said someone should "start a bloody fund to send John O'Hara to Yale." As his literary acclaim grew, O'Hara yearned for an honorary degree from Yale, but never received it. According to Gill, the college was unwilling to award the honor precisely because O'Hara had obstreperously "asked for it."

== Career and reputation ==
Initially, O'Hara worked as a reporter for various newspapers. Moving to New York City, he began to write short stories for magazines. During the early part of his career, he was also a film critic, a radio commentator and a press agent. In 1934, O'Hara published his first novel, Appointment in Samarra. Endorsing the novel, Ernest Hemingway wrote: "If you want to read a book by a man who knows exactly what he is writing about and has written it marvelously well, read Appointment in Samarra." O'Hara followed Samarra with BUtterfield 8, his roman à clef based upon the tragic, short life of flapper Starr Faithfull, whose mysterious death in 1931 became a tabloid sensation. Over four decades, O'Hara published novels, novellas, plays, screenplays and more than 400 short stories, the majority of them in the New Yorker.

During World War II, he was a correspondent in the Pacific theater. After the war, he wrote screenplays and more novels, including Ten North Frederick, for which he won the 1956 National Book Award and From the Terrace (1958), which he considered his "greatest achievement as a novelist." Late in life, with his reputation established, he became a newspaper columnist. In his last decade, O'Hara created "a body of work of magnificent dimensions," wrote the novelist George V. Higgins, whose own trademark dialogue was influenced heavily by O'Hara's style. "Between 1960 and 1968," Higgins noted, O'Hara "published six novels, seven collections of short fiction, and some 137 terse and extended stories that all by themselves would supply credentials for a towering reputation in the world of perfect justice that he never did quite find."

First edition cover of Appointment in Samarra

Many of O'Hara's stories (and his later novels written in the 1950s) are set in Gibbsville, Pennsylvania, a barely fictionalized version of his home town of Pottsville, a small city in the anthracite region of the northeastern United States. He named Gibbsville for his friend and frequent editor at the New Yorker Wolcott Gibbs. Most of his other stories were set in New York or Hollywood.

O'Hara's short stories earned him his highest critical acclaim. He contributed more of them to the New Yorker than any other writer. He complained that his numerous short stories took his time away from writing novels. "I had an apparently inexhaustible urge to express an unlimited supply of short story ideas. No writing has ever come more easily to me," he claimed. In the Library of America's collection of 60 of O'Hara's best stories, editor Charles McGrath praises them for their "sketchlike lightness and brevity... in which nothing necessarily 'happens' in the old-fashioned sense, but in which some crucial loss or discovery is revealed just by implication ... a sense of speed and economy is just what makes the best of these stories so thrilling." Gill, who worked with O'Hara at the New Yorker, ranks him "among the greatest short-story writers in English, or in any other language" and credits him with helping "to invent what the world came to call the New Yorker short story." In the foreword to a collection published four years before his death, O'Hara declared, "No one writes them any better than I do." Two more volumes of his stories were published soon after his death.

Despite his success as a best-selling author, most of O'Hara's longer work is not held in as high regard by the literary establishment. Critic Benjamin Schwarz and writer Christina Schwarz claimed: "So widespread is the literary world's scorn for John O'Hara that the inclusion of Appointment in Samarra on the Modern Library's list of the 100 best English-language novels of the twentieth century was used to ridicule the entire project." Some of O'Hara's novels and stories are tied off with clumsy, abrupt endings. Some of the harsh literary criticism is attributed to personal dislike of O'Hara's abrasive ego and arrogant manner, his vigorous self-promotion, his obsession with his social status, and the politically conservative columns he wrote late in his career. Early and mid-20th century critics also disparaged his novels for their blunt and non-judgmental depictions of loose women and homosexuals, but critics writing after the sexual revolution saw in O'Hara a pioneer in showing sexuality in frank, realistic ways. John Kenneth Galbraith, writing about the strict Calvinist culture of his early 20th century childhood in remote, rural Ontario, remembered, "We were taught that sexual intercourse was, under all circumstances, a sin, and we were free from the countervailing influence of movies, television and John O'Hara." O'Hara's most biting critics regard his novels as shallow and overly concerned with sexual desire, drinking and surface details at the expense of deeper meaning. Many of his leading characters are alcoholics who live as emotional zombies, anesthetized by drinking to the agony of the human heart in conflict with itself. As his contemporary William Faulkner said of such writers in his Nobel Prize address of 1949, "He writes not of the heart but of the glands."

In 1949, O'Hara left the New Yorker bitterly, after it published a withering review of O'Hara's long novel A Rage to Live by his colleague Brendan Gill. Gill disparaged O'Hara's book as "a formula family novel," one of those turned out by "writers of the third and fourth magnitude in such disheartening abundance," and declared it "a catastrophe" by an author who "plainly intended to write nothing less than a great American novel." Literary critics called Gill's review a "savage attack" and a "cruel hatchet job" on one of the New Yorker's most popular writers. "During the preceding two decades O'Hara had been the New Yorker's most prolific contributor of stories" (no fewer than 197 by one count). After the magazine published Gill's review, O'Hara quit writing for the New Yorker for more than a decade, and when readers complained to Gill for driving O'Hara away, Gill deflected blame onto another New Yorker contributor, James Thurber, for stirring up animosity. O'Hara would not resume writing for the New Yorker until the 1960s, upon the arrival of a new editor who sought out O'Hara with an olive branch. Nearly 50 years after the scandalous review, at a forum on O'Hara's legacy held in 1996, Gill stood up in the audience to explain his attack on O'Hara, pleading that "I had to tell the truth about the novel."

According to biographer Frank MacShane, O'Hara thought that Hemingway's death made O'Hara the leading candidate for the Nobel Prize in Literature. O'Hara wrote to his daughter, "I really think I will get it," and "I want the Nobel prize ... so bad I can taste it." MacShane says that T.S. Eliot told O'Hara that he had, in fact, been nominated twice. When John Steinbeck won the prize in 1962, O'Hara wired, "Congratulations, I can think of only one other author I'd rather see get it." In a letter to Steinbeck two years before that, O'Hara placed himself with Steinbeck in the pantheon of great 20th century American writers, Hemingway, Fitzgerald and Faulkner, singling out Faulkner among them as "the one, the genius."

O'Hara's work has many literary admirers, including authors such as Joan Didion, John Updike, Tom Wolfe, Gay Talese, Fran Lebowitz and Shelby Foote. Charles McGrath, a former fiction editor of the New Yorker and former editor of the New York Times Book Review, has called O'Hara "one of the great listeners of American fiction, able to write dialogue that sounded the way people really talk, and he also learned the eavesdropper's secret—how often people leave unsaid what is really on their minds." O'Hara said he learned from reading Ring Lardner "that if you wrote down speech as it is spoken truly, you produce true characters," and added, "Sometimes I almost feel that I ought to apologize for having the ability to write good dialogue, and yet it's the attribute most lacking in American writers and almost totally lacking in the British."

== Death ==
O'Hara died from cardiovascular disease in Princeton, New Jersey, and is interred in the Princeton Cemetery. A comment he made about himself and which was chosen by his wife for his epitaph reads: "Better than anyone else, he told the truth about his time. He was a professional. He wrote honestly and well." Of this, Gill commented: "From the far side of the grave, he remains self-defensive and overbearing. Better than anyone else? Not merely better than any other writer of fiction but better than any dramatist, any poet, any biographer, any historian? It is an astonishing claim."

After his death, O'Hara's study and its contents were reconstructed in 1974 for display at Pennsylvania State University, where his papers are held. His childhood home, the John O'Hara House in Pottsville, was added to the National Register of Historic Places in 1978.

== Adaptations ==
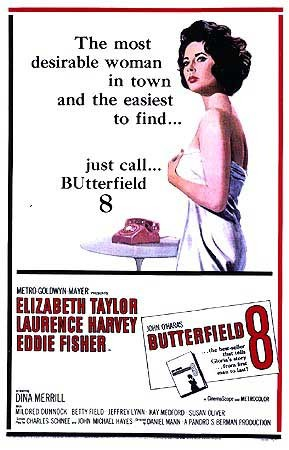
Poster for the film BUtterfield 8

O'Hara's epistolary novel Pal Joey (1940) led to the successful Broadway musical, with libretto by O'Hara and songs by Rodgers and Hart. In 1957, Pal Joey was made into a musical film starring Rita Hayworth, Frank Sinatra, Kim Novak, and Barbara Nichols.

From the Terrace is a 1960 film adapted from O'Hara's 1958 novel. The film starred Paul Newman as disenchanted Alfred Eaton, son of a wealthy but indifferent father and alcoholic mother as well as Joanne Woodward as his socially ambitious, self-pitying and unfaithful wife Mary St. John.

Also in 1960, O'Hara's best-selling 1935 novel BUtterfield 8 was released as a film with the same name. Elizabeth Taylor won the Academy Award for Best Actress for her portrayal of Gloria Wandrous. Of the film version, Taylor famously said, "I think it stinks."

Ten North Frederick is a 1958 film based on O'Hara's 1955 novel. Gary Cooper starred as Joe Chapin, with Diane Varsi, Ray Stricklyn, Suzy Parker, and Geraldine Fitzgerald in supporting roles. O'Hara called Cooper's performance "sensitive, understanding and true."

A Rage to Live is a 1965 film directed by Walter Grauman and starring Suzanne Pleshette as Grace Caldwell Tate, a well-mannered, upper-crust beauty whose passions wreak havoc on her social circle. The screenplay by John T. Kelley is based on O'Hara's best-selling 1949 novel.

O'Hara's short stories about Gibbsville were used as the basis for the 1975 NBC television movie John O'Hara's Gibbsville (also known as The Turning Point of Jim Malloy) and for the short-lived 1976 NBC dramatic television series Gibbsville.

In 1987, an adaptation of O'Hara's 1966 story "Natica Jackson," about a film actress in 1930s Hollywood, was produced for the PBS anthology series Great Performances. It was directed by Paul Bogart and starred Michelle Pfeiffer in the title role.

The television period drama series Mad Men, on AMC from 2007 to 2015, generated renewed popular interest in O'Hara's work, which dealt with similar themes of mid-20th century American society.

== Columns ==
In the early 1950s, O'Hara wrote a weekly book column, "Sweet and Sour" for the Trenton Times-Advertiser and a biweekly column, "Appointment with O'Hara", for Collier's magazine. MacShane calls them "garrulous and outspoken" and says neither "added much of importance to O'Hara's work". Biographer Shelden Grebstein says that O'Hara in these columns was "simultaneously embarrassing and infuriating in his vaingloriousness, vindictiveness, and general bellicosity." Biographer Geoffrey Woolf says these earlier columns anticipated "his disastrous 'My Turn' in Newsday, which endured fifty-three weeks ... beginning in late 1964... of his dismissive and contemptuous worst".

His first Newsday column opened with the line, "Let's get off to a really bad start." His second complained, "the same hysteria that afflicted the Prohibitionists is now evident among the anti-cigarettists." His third column nominally supported the Republican Party nominee Barry Goldwater for U.S. president by identifying his cause with fans of the corny accordionist and band leader Lawrence Welk. "I think it's time the Lawrence Welk people had their say," wrote O'Hara. "The Lester Lanin and Dizzy Gillespie people have been on too long. When the country is in trouble, like war kind of trouble, man, it is the Lawrence Welk people who can be depended upon, all the way." In his fifth column, he argued that Martin Luther King Jr. should not have received the Nobel Peace Prize.

The syndicated column was not a success, published by a continuously decreasing number of newspapers, and did not endear him to the politically liberal New York literary establishment.

Several of his columns demonstrate his knowledge of trivia about and yearning for association with Ivy League colleges. As he noted, "Through the years I have acquired a vast amount of information about colleges and universities." The May 8, 1965, column takes as its ostensible topic the fact that Yale owns stock in American Broadcasting Company and thus is a beneficiary of the television program Peyton Place. O'Hara writes:

[I]n that Yale Blue Heaven Up Above, where William Lyon Phelps and Henry Seidel Canby may meet every afternoon for tea, there must be some embarrassment. Assuming that Harvard men also go to heaven (Princeton men go back to Old Nassau), I fancy that they are having a little fun with Dr. Phelps and Dr. Canby on the subject of Peyton Place.

Later, he notes that James Gould Cozzens is a "genuine Harvard alumnus" and speculates that Harvard should broker a television serialization of a Cozzens novel:

But Cozzens makes his home in Williamstown, Mass., and they have a college there. When Sinclair Lewis lived in Williamstown the college ignored him, possibly because Lewis was a Yale man, although I am only guessing on that. I live in Princeton, N. J. and am not a Yale man, but official Princeton University has ignored me as Williams did Lewis.

His September 4, 1965, column deals entirely with his failure to have received any honorary degrees, going into detail about three honorary degrees he was actually offered but, for various reasons, did not accept. In the column, he lists the awards he has received:

In a long and (I believe) useful literary career I have received five major honors. Not to be bashful about it, they are: the National Book Award; membership in the National Institute of Arts and Letters; the Gold Medal of the Academy of Arts and Letters; the Critics Circle Award; and the Donaldson award. You will note that among them is no recognition by the institutions of higher learning.

He complains that the colleges write him "highly complimentary" letters asking him to perform "chores" such as officiating as writer-in-residence, judging literary contests, and give lectures, yet do not give him degree citations. "The five major distinctions," he notes, "were awarded me by other writers, not by [academia]."

The column closes with the comment:

If Yale had given me a degree, I could have joined the Yale Club, where the food is pretty good, the library is ample and restful, the location convenient, and I could go there when I felt like it without sponging off friends. They also have a nice-looking necktie.

== Bibliography ==
=== Novels ===
- Appointment in Samarra (1934)
- BUtterfield 8 (1935)
- Hope of Heaven (1938)
- Pal Joey (1940)
- A Rage to Live (1949)
- The Farmers Hotel (1951) — adapted from O'Hara's original play
- Ten North Frederick (1955) — winner of the National Book Award for Fiction
- A Family Party (1956)
- From the Terrace (1958)
- Ourselves to Know (1960)
- The Big Laugh (1962)
- Elizabeth Appleton (1963)
- The Lockwood Concern (1965)
- The Instrument (1967)
- Lovey Childs: A Philadelphian's Story (1969)
- The Ewings (1970)
- The Second Ewings (1972)

=== Short story collections ===
- The Doctor’s Son and Other Stories (1935)
- Files on Parade (1939)
- Pipe Night (1945)
- Hellbox (1947)
- Sermons and Soda Water: A Trilogy of Three Novellas (1960)
- Assembly (1961)
- The Cape Cod Lighter (1962)
- The Hat on the Bed (1963)
- The Horse Knows the Way (1964)
- Waiting for Winter (1966)
- And Other Stories (1968)
- The Time Element and Other Stories (1972)
- Good Samaritan and Other Stories (1974)
- Gibbsville, PA (Carroll & Graf, 1992, ISBN 0-88184-899-9)

=== Screenplays ===
- He Married His Wife (1940)
- Moontide (1942)

=== Plays ===
- Five Plays (1961)

(The Farmers Hotel, The Searching Sun, The Champagne Pool, Veronique, The Way It Was)

- Two by O'Hara (1979)

(The Man Who Could Not Lose [screen treatment] and Far from Heaven [play])

=== Nonfiction ===
- Sweet and Sour (1954) Assorted columns on books and authors
- My Turn (1966). Fifty-three weekly columns written for Newsday
- Letters (1978).

=== Other ===
BUtterfield 8, Pal Joey and The Doctor's Son and Other Stories were published as Armed Services Editions during WWII.
