= BUtterfield 8 (novel) =

1935 novel by John O'Hara

- Author: John O'Hara
- Language: English
- Genre: Roman à clef
- Publication date: 1935

BUtterfield 8 (1935) is a realist novel by John O'Hara. It is a roman à clef loosely based upon the life of socialite and flapper Starr Faithfull, whose unsolved death in 1931 became a tabloid sensation. Reviews were mixed but the novel was a best-seller.

It was adapted for a 1960 movie of the same name, starring Elizabeth Taylor and Laurence Harvey. A paperback edition published at the same time sold more than one million copies. In 2019, it was one of four John O'Hara novels published in a collection by the Library of America.

== Synopsis ==
The novel explores the life of Gloria Wandrous, a young woman having an affair with Weston Liggett, an older, married businessman. Set in New York circa 1931, it fills in her family background and sexual history, and it locates her within a circle of friends, their relationships, and economic struggles, providing a closely observed tour of "the sordid and sensational lives of people on the fringe of café society and the underworld". The minor character of Jimmy Malloy, a junior newspaper reporter, serves as O'Hara’s alter ego; he has the style of a Yale University graduate, but not the means.

== Title ==
The title of the novel derives from the pattern of telephone exchange names in the United States and Canada. Until the early 1970s, telephone exchanges were indicated by two letters and commonly referred to by names instead of by numbers, with the BU represented on the telephone dial as "28," followed by four digits. In December 1930, an additional digit was appended to the exchange name. BUtterfield was an exchange that provided service to Manhattan's well-to-do Upper East Side, and BUtterfield 8 was still new when the novel was published.

== Reception ==
Clifton Fadiman's review in The New Yorker was titled "Disappointment in O'Hara", and Heywood Broun said O'Hara's characters all spoke with the same voice. Ernest Hemingway supplied the publisher with a blurb: "John O'Hara writes better all the time."

The New York Times said it provided "the ultra-ultra in fictional depiction of the willful degradation of sex".

== Adaptations ==
The novel was adapted for a film of the same name that was released in 1960. It starred Elizabeth Taylor, who won the Academy Award for Best Actress for her portrayal of Gloria Wandrous. O'Hara did not participate in writing the adaptation, and publicity for the film did not mention his name.

With the release of the movie, more than 1 million paperback copies of the novel were sold. In a review of the movie, the Harvard Crimson described BUtterfield 8 "one of O'Hara's few good novels" and "one of the truly great chronicles of the 1930s".

In 1960, at the time of the movie and paperback edition, O'Hara described his ambition in writing this novel: "I was determined to make plain what I had seen." He claimed to have suppressed the more shocking details of the story and enjoyed that it was nevertheless "a shocker to the literary cocktail party set". He wrote:

The novel is not remarkable for the differences so much as for the similarities to 1930 in 1960. ... I am inclined to believe that my novels may all be as reliable as the work of the formal historians of our time.

O'Hara donated the typescript of the novel to Yale, and complained when an article in the Yale Alumni Magazine about the school’s holdings in American literature omitted mention of him.

== Later reviews ==
When Random House republished the novel in 1995, Margo Jefferson criticized its prose but wrote that O'Hara was

"full of passion and honest spleen, driven to show why we live and act the way we do. And how he understands class structure, American-style! The comedy of it and the meanness, the social climbing and the downward plunges, the tricky business of balancing your ethnic debits against your physical or financial assets."

In 2013, writing in The New Yorker, Lorin Stein called BUtterfield 8 "one of the great novels of New York in the Depression". He noted that the novel remains fresh in presenting a wide range of sexual behaviors from the point of view of a woman and also allowing her an intense friendship–love on his part–with a male peer, commercial illustrator Eddie Brunner.

== Legacy and honors ==
BUtterfield 8 was one of four O'Hara novels included in a collection published by the Library of America in 2019.
