= Pal Joey (novel) =

1940 epistolary novel by John O'Hara

- First ed. cover
- Author: John O'Hara
- Language: English
- Publisher: Duell, Sloan and Pearce
- Publication date: 1940 (first edition)
- Publication place: United States
- Media type: Print
- Pages: 195 p.
- OCLC: 653710

Pal Joey is a 1940 epistolary novel by John O'Hara, which became the basis of the 1940 stage musical comedy and 1957 motion picture of the same name, with music by Richard Rodgers and lyrics by Lorenz Hart. It was originally written as a series of episodic short stories in The New Yorker in the late 1930s.

== Plot ==
Taking the form of letters from "pal Joey" to "dear Pal Ted", a second-rate nightclub singer recounts his life in 1930s Chicago, with a focus on money and women. Although he does not seem aware of it, Joey's letters reveal him to be an amoral, calculating heel whose venality is cloaked by an amiable persona. He also does not seem aware of his frequent spelling and grammatical errors (really choices by O'Hara to convey Joey's voice):

Dear Friend Ted

That is if I can call you friend after the last two weeks for it is a hard thing to do considering. I do not know if you realize what has happen to me oweing to your lack of consideraton [sic]. Maybe it is not lack of consideraton [sic]. Maybe it is on purpose. Well if it is on purpose all I have to say is maybe you are the one that will be the loser and not me as I was going to do certain things for you but now it does not look like I will be able to do them....

== Contents ==
The stories are

- Pal Joey
- Ex-Pal
- How I Am Now in Chi.
- Bow Wow
- Avast and Belay
- Joey on Herta
- Joey on the Cake Line
- The Erloff
- Even the Greeks
- Joey and the Calcutta Club
- Joey and Mavis
- A New Career
- A Bit of a Shock
- Reminiss?
