= William Palmer (novelist) =

American novelist (born 1943)

William J. Palmer (born 1943) is an American professor of English and the author of the "Mr. Dickens" series of Victorian murder mysteries. He is also the author of "The Wabash Trilogy" (2010), three novels under one cover. The trilogy includes: "The Wabash Baseball Blues", a sports novel about industrial softball; "The Red Neck Mafia", a crime novel; and "Civic Theater", a comic backstage novel. all three of these novels are set in the Wabash river valley of Indiana.

His The Uses of Money (2016), set in post-hurricanes, post-earthquake Haiti, is the story of a love affair set against the backdrop of an American mission trip. At times a romance, at times a kidnap thriller, but always a work of global social consciousness, it explores the potential for humanitarian aid to the world's poorest heart of darkness.

His Two Cities (2017) is a bi-coastal political eco-thriller set in Washington D.C. and Los Angeles. Before, during, and after the biggest protest march in modern history, two brothers must fight to put the world back together. As the title signals, this novel poses the literary question: "What would Dickens's A Tale of Two Cities read like if written in 2017?"

Academically, Palmer has written books and articles on the nature of literary criticism and the history of film.

Dr. Palmer received his doctorate in English from the University of Notre Dame in 1969, and taught at Purdue University beginning in 1969. He attained the rank of full professor there and is now professor emeritus. He received Purdue's "Charles B. Murphy Outstanding Undergraduate Teaching Award" for academic year 1998–1999, and he was a member of the elite "Purdue Teaching Academy".

== Mr. Dickens series ==
Palmer's four historical murder mysteries about "Mr. Dickens" (Charles Dickens) were selections of The Literary Guild, The Book of the Month Club, The Mystery Guild, and The Doubleday Book Club.

- The Detective and Mr. Dickens (1990),
- The Highwayman and Mr. Dickens (1992),
- The Hoydens and Mr. Dickens (1997), and
- The Dons and Mr. Dickens (2001).
