= Mary Queen of Peace Catholic Church (Pottsville, Pennsylvania) =

Mary, Queen of Peace Catholic Church
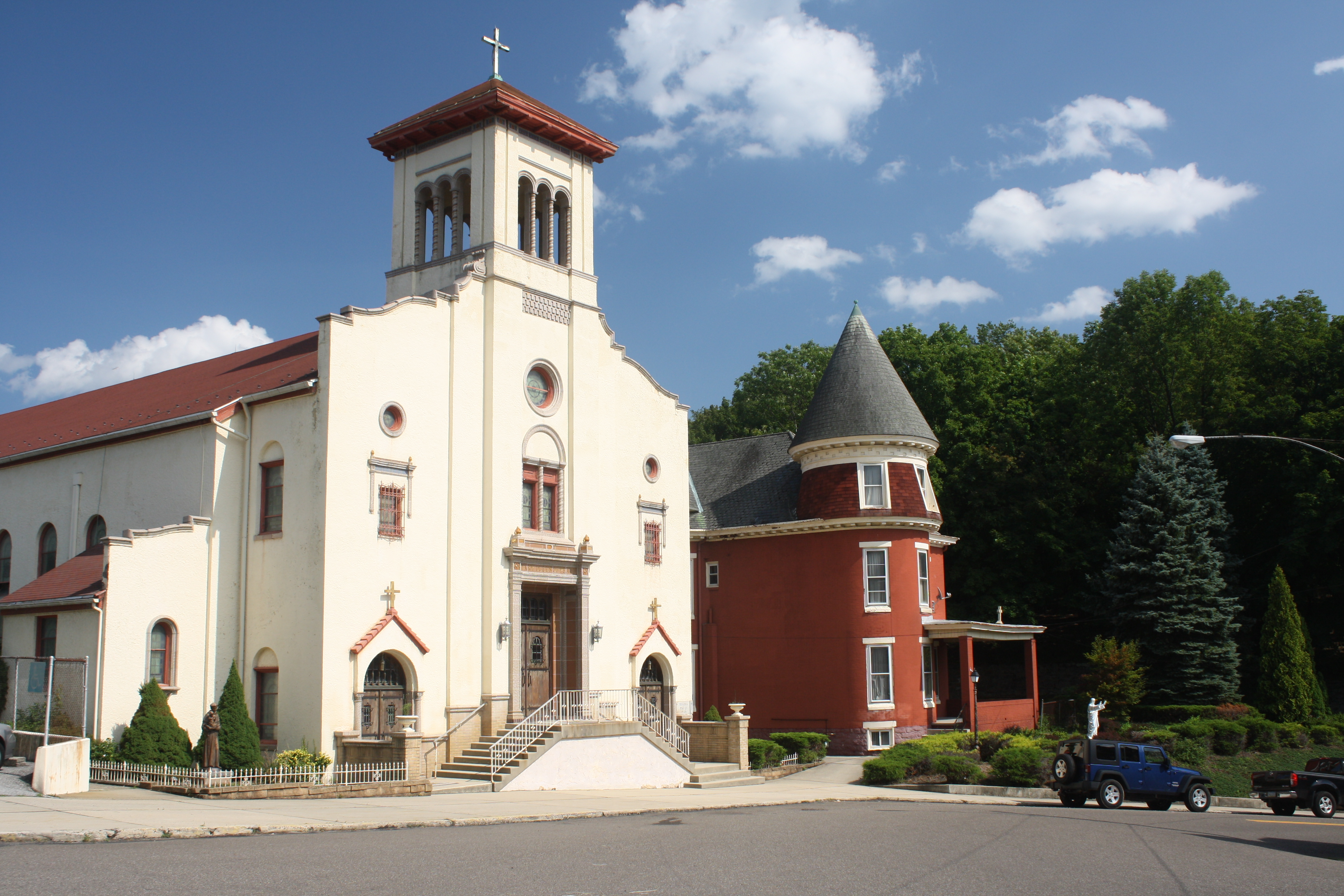
- Mary Queen of Peace Catholic Church in 2012

- Location within Pennsylvania
- 40°41′38.5″N 76°11′54.4″W
- Location: 730 North Centre Street, Pottsville, Pennsylvania
- Country: U.S.
- Denomination: Roman Catholic
- Website: Official website

History
- Founded: 1920

Architecture
- Functional status: Catholic Chapel
- Architect(s): G. C. Freeman of Reading, Pennsylvania
- Architectural type: Spanish Mission Style
- Groundbreaking: 1928
- Completed: 1929

Administration
- Archdiocese: Archdiocese of Philadelphia
- Diocese: Diocese of Allentown

Mary Queen of Peace Church, Pottsville is a historic Roman Catholic church located at 730 North Centre Street in Pottsville, Pennsylvania. The current structure was built in 1929 and reopened on September 22, 2025, as a Catholic chapel within the Diocese of Allentown. Today, it is owned and maintained by the Society of Mary Queen of Peace of Pottsville, which preserves the chapel in perpetuity as a sacred house of worship.

== History ==
=== 20th century ===
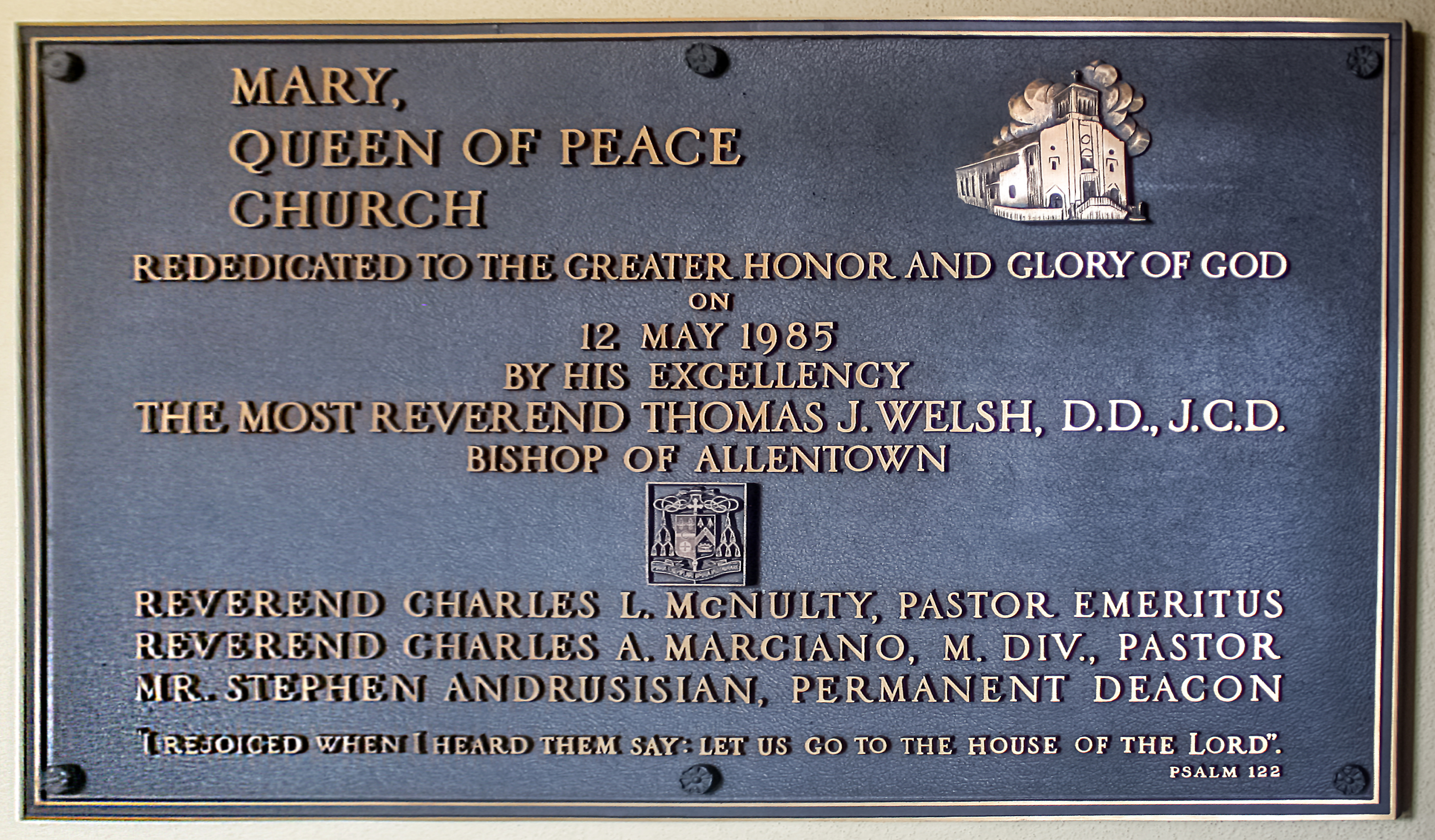
The 1985 rededication plaque of the church

Mary Queen of Peace Parish in Pottsville was established in 1919 under the direction of Cardinal Dennis Dougherty of Philadelphia to serve Catholics in the Fishbach, Jalappa, New Street, and Mount Laffee areas, which had previously depended on older city parishes. Father George W. Shay, a Pottsville native and pastor of Mary Star of the Sea in Branchdale, was appointed to organize the new parish and secured the former Seltzer property on Centre Street as its permanent site.

The parish began in modest surroundings. A large brick building on the property was adapted for use as a rectory and temporary chapel, while the former stables in the rear were converted into a larger chapel that was ready for occupancy on August 15, 1920, the Feast of the Assumption; from that day forward, the converted stable chapel became the center of parish worship.

As the congregation grew, Mary Queen of Peace developed rapidly. The parish established a school and convent in the 1920s, and the present Spanish Mission–style church was begun in 1928; Cardinal Dougherty laid its cornerstone before a large gathering of parishioners and friends, and the completed church was dedicated on August 25, 1929, by Auxiliary Bishop Gerald P. O’Hara.

Throughout the twentieth century, Mary Queen of Peace remained a center of Catholic worship, education, and community life in Pottsville. The church was rededicated on May 12, 1985, marking another important moment in its continuing history within the Roman Catholic Diocese of Allentown.

=== 21st century ===
In July 2008, Mary Queen of Peace Parish was selected to close and consolidate with Saint Patrick’s Parish as part of the Roman Catholic Diocese of Allentown’s restructuring of parishes. The parish celebrated its final regularly scheduled Mass on July 13, 2008, before being merged into Saint Patrick Parish.

On August 15, 2012, Holy Mass on the Solemnity of the Assumption of Mary was celebrated at Mary Queen of Peace for the first time since its closure. The church was filled to capacity, with more than 300 former parishioners and visitors attending the Mass.

In 2024, local Catholics formed the Society of Mary Queen of Peace of Pottsville, Inc., a Pennsylvania nonprofit corporation established for the purpose of preserving Mary Queen of Peace Church as a Catholic sacred space and maintaining the property for private prayer and Catholic devotional activities. The organization subsequently entered into an agreement with the Diocese of Allentown to acquire the church property and ensure its continued Catholic religious use.

On September 22, 2025, Mary Queen of Peace reopened as a Catholic chapel following the sale of the property by the Diocese of Allentown to the Society of Mary Queen of Peace of Pottsville, Inc. The chapel hosts annual Masses on the Feast of Mary Queen of Peace on July 9 and on the anniversary of the church’s dedication on August 25. Funerals, weddings, and other sacramental celebrations may also be permitted with the approval of the Bishop of Allentown.

== Society of Mary Queen of Peace of Pottsville ==
The Society of Mary Queen of Peace of Pottsville, Inc. is a Pennsylvania nonprofit corporation formed to preserve Mary Queen of Peace Church as a Catholic sacred space and maintain the property for private prayer and Catholic devotional activities. The Society owns and maintains the church, which reopened as a Catholic chapel in 2025 following its acquisition from the Roman Catholic Diocese of Allentown.

By decree of the Bishop of Allentown, the Society was recognized as a private association of the Christian faithful under canon law and authorized to use the designation “Catholic” in carrying out its mission. Organized as a nonstock corporation and recognized as a charitable organization under section 501(c)(3) of the Internal Revenue Code, the Society supports the ongoing preservation of the chapel through volunteer efforts, fundraising initiatives, and devotional programming.

== Mary Queen of Peace Parochial School ==
The Mary Queen of Peace Parochial School was a coeducational Catholic grade school part of the Mary Queen Parish. The school first opened in fall 1925 after rectors of the city's two original parishes, St. John the Baptist Church, Pottsville, PA and St. Patrick's noticed that overcrowding and distance were negative factors for those residing in the Fishbach and Jalappa residential districts. A letter written by Cardinal Dougherty in 1919 directed that a new parish be established with land being purchased at Center and Nichols Street. The temporary location of the mission church was located at nearby Mt. Laffee.

Once the debt financing the construction of the main church and the purchasing of the rectory was established, discussions began on plans to open a parochial school as well as a convent for the Sisters of the Immaculate Heart of Mary who would serve as the faculty. An original home in the complex was remodeled and enlarged with a second property converted into the convent. The school opened in September 1925.

After 41 years of service, the school was no longer able to meet safety standards as the building deteriorated with age. Considerable renovations and modifications would have been needed in order for the facility to remain in compliance. Rather than move forward with the renovations, the diocese determined demolition would be more cost effective. Approximately 180 pupils were transferred to St. John the Baptist School on the 900 block of Howard Avenue after a meeting with Rev. Charles McNulty of Mary Queen of Peace and Rev. Francis J. Fox of St. John's. The school was closed on June 15, 1966.

== See also ==
- List of churches in Pottsville, Pennsylvania
