= Mahantango =

Mahantango is an alternate spelling of Mahantongo, a Lenape word, translated "where we had plenty of meat to eat" or "good hunting grounds."

Mahantango may refer to:

- Mahantango Creek, a tributary of the Susquehanna River in Dauphin, Northumberland, and Schuylkill counties, in Pennsylvania
- Mahantango Creek (Snyder County), a tributary of the Susquehanna River in Snyder and Juniata counties, in Pennsylvania
- Mahantango Formation, a mapped bedrock unit in Pennsylvania, New Jersey, New York and Maryland
