= List of churches in Pottsville, Pennsylvania =

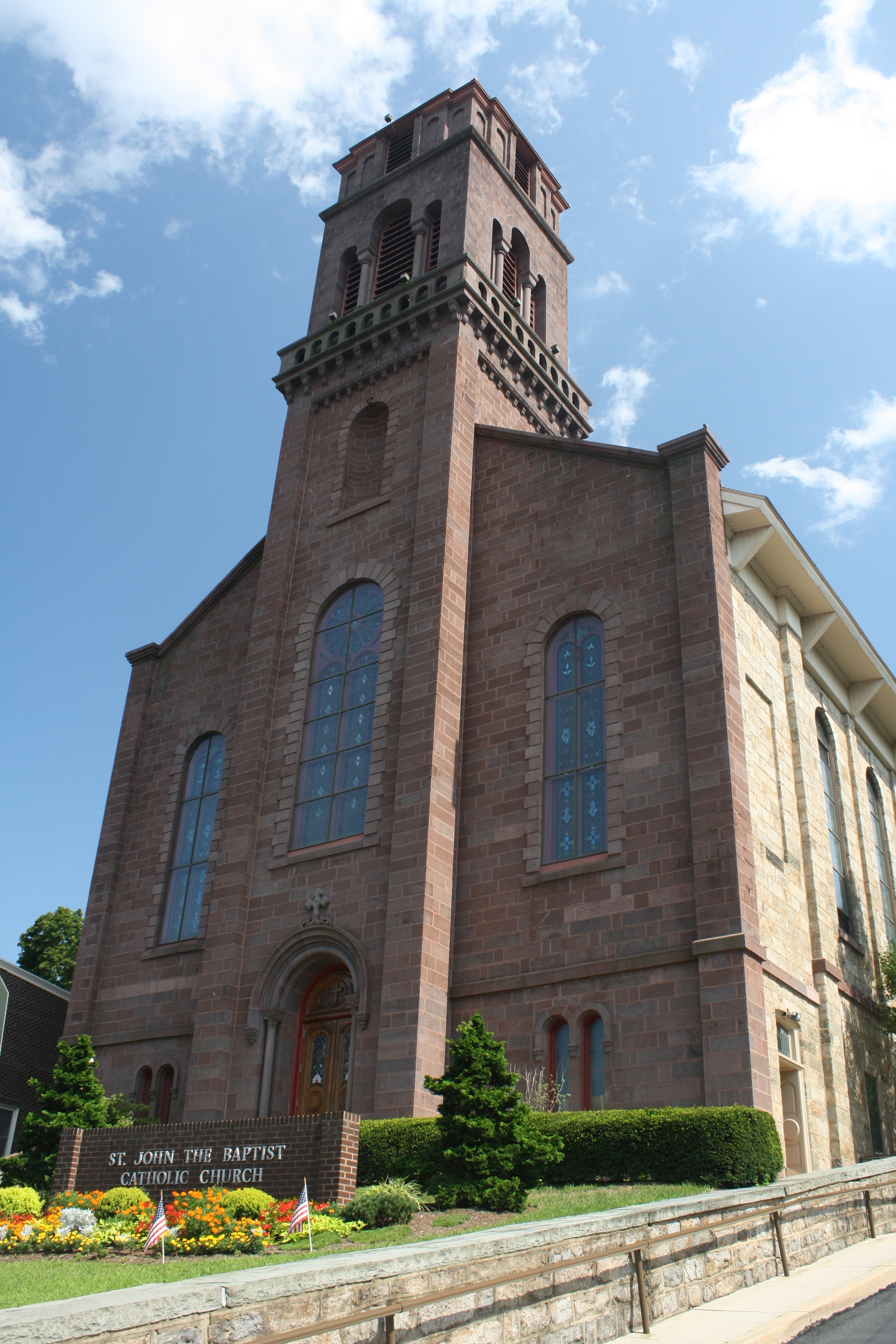
St. John the Baptist Church in Pottsville, Pennsylvania

The churches of Pottsville are numerous and diverse. Founded by John Pott, Pottsville, Pennsylvania has many historic and significant churches.

== Protestant ==
- Evangelical United Methodist Church, 305 S Centre St
- First Baptist Church, 701 Mahantongo St
- First United Methodist Church , 330 W Market St
- Iglesia Cristiana El Kairos, 912 W Market St
- Trinity Episcopal Church , 200 S 2nd St
- Trinity Lutheran Church , 300 W Arch St
- Trinity United Church of Christ , 316 W Market St
- Salvation Army , 400 Sanderson St
- United Presbyterian Church, 214 Mahantongo St
- Word of Life Baptist Church, 302 N Centre St

== Roman Catholic ==
- St. John the Baptist Church (Pottsville, Pennsylvania) , 913 Mahantongo St
- Saint Patrick Roman Catholic Church , 319 Mahantongo St
- Mary Queen of Peace Catholic Church (Pottsville, Pennsylvania) , 730 N. Centre St

== See also ==
- Partners for Sacred Places
