= Yorkville (Pottsville, Pennsylvania) =

Neighborhood in Pottsville, Pennsylvania

Coordinates: 40.675°N 76.215°W

Yorkville is a neighborhood located in the west end of Pottsville, Schuylkill County, Pennsylvania.

== Background ==
Yorkville begins at 16th Street and continues westward to the West Branch of the Schuylkill River and the city limits. Mahantongo Street, once home to many prominent residents of Pottsville, is also located within the neighborhood. Yorkville was incorporated as a borough on March 8, 1865, and its first burgess was Joseph Scheibelhut. In 1900 the borough had a population of 1,125 and was later annexed by the city of Pottsville in 1908. Today, Yorkville is Pottsville's 7th Ward of which the ward limits are the same boundaries as the former borough of Yorkville. Until recently, it was a middle to upper-middle class and heavily German Catholic neighborhood.

The main thoroughfares that transverse this section of town are Mahantongo Street, Norwegian Street, Market Street, Howard Avenue, West End Avenue, Elk Avenue, First Avenue, Second Avenue, Third Avenue, Gordon Nagle Trail, Westwood Road, King Avenue, Queen Avenue, Montgomery Avenue, 16th Street, 18th Street, 20th Street, 23rd Street, and 26th Street.
