= John O'Hara House =

Historic house in Pennsylvania, United States

- U.S. National Register of Historic Places
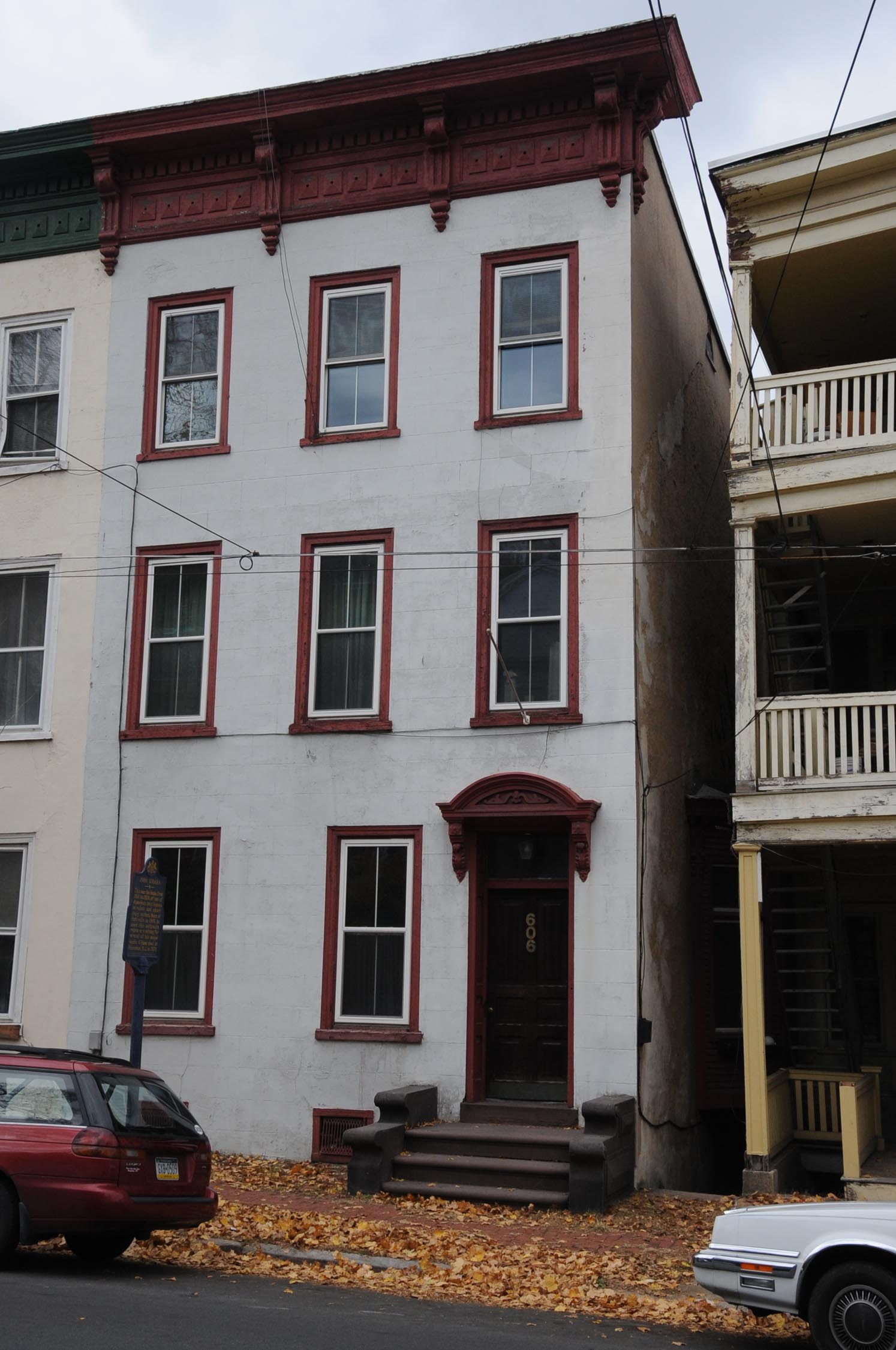
- John O'Hara House, November 2008

- Location within Pennsylvania Location within the United States
- Location: 606 Mahantongo St., Pottsville, Pennsylvania
- Coordinates: 40°40′58″N 76°11′59″W
- Area: 0.2 acres (0.081 ha)
- Built: c. 1870
- Built by: Yuengling, David
- Architectural style: Italianate
- NRHP reference No.: 78002466
- Added to NRHP: May 22, 1978

The John O'Hara House is an historic home that is located in Pottsville, Pennsylvania, United States.

It was added to the National Register of Historic Places in 1978.

== History and architectural features ==
Built circa 1870, this historic structure is a three-story, three-bay-wide, stone building that was designed in the Italianate style. The front elevation features a three-story central tower. The house was built by David Yuengling of the Yuengling brewery family. It was the childhood home of author John O'Hara (1905–1970), whose father purchased the house in 1916 and remained there until 1940.
