= St. John the Baptist Church (Pottsville, Pennsylvania) =

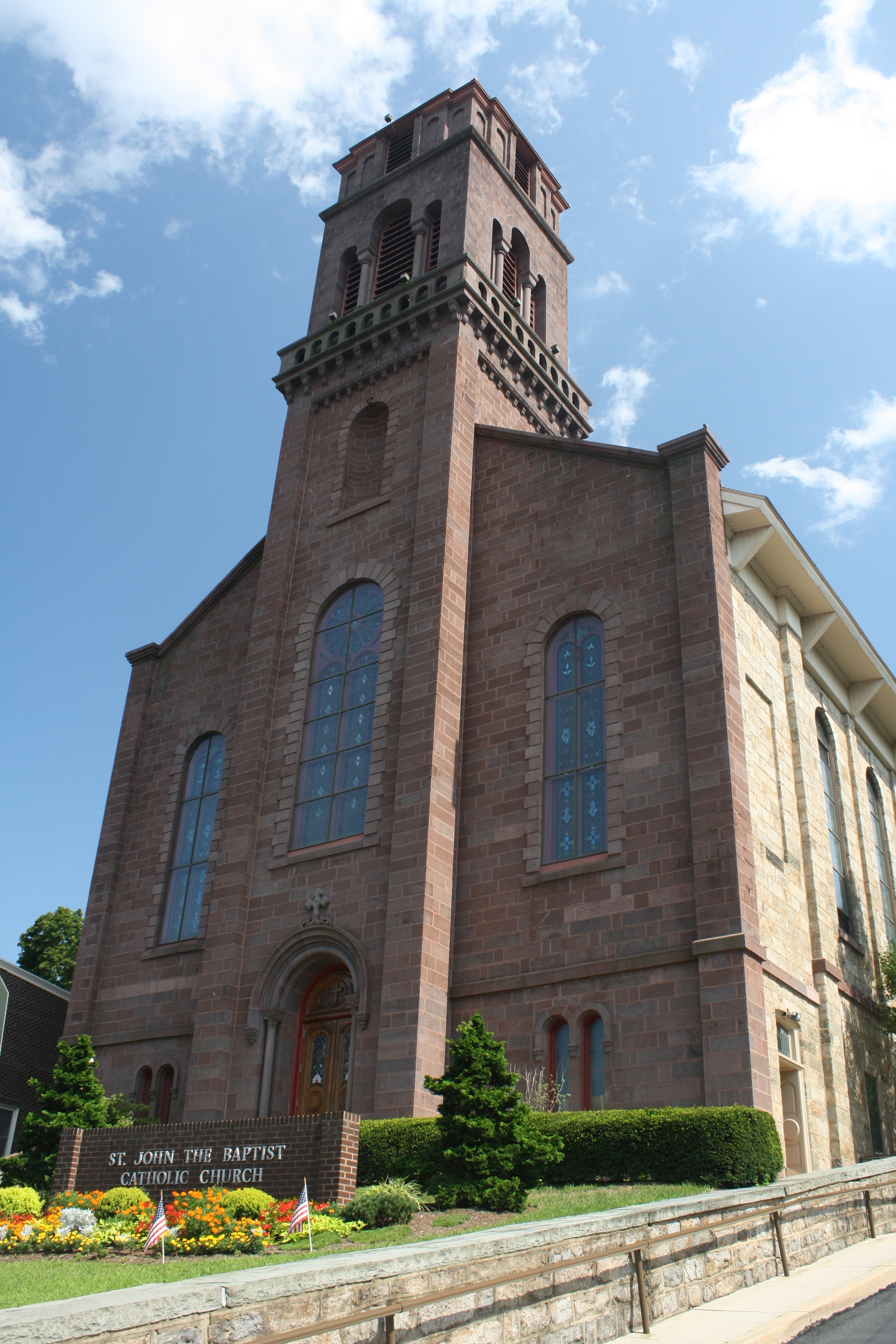
- St. John the Baptist Church in September 2012

- Location of St. John the Baptist Church in Pennsylvania
- 40°40′51″N 76°12′05″W
- Location: 913 Mahantongo Street, Pottsville, Pennsylvania
- Country: U.S.
- Denomination: Roman Catholic

History
- Founded: 1841

Architecture
- Completed: 1869

Administration
- Archdiocese: Archdiocese of Philadelphia
- Diocese: Diocese of Allentown

St. John the Baptist Roman Catholic Church is a Roman Catholic church in Pottsville, Pennsylvania. The seventh oldest church in the Allentown Diocese, it was established in 1841, and is located at Tenth and Mahantongo Streets. The current structure was built in 1872.

== History ==
St. John the Baptist Church was founded in 1841 by German Catholic immigrants, mostly from Grossenlueder, a village near Fulda, and the Rhenish Palatinate. The original church at Fourth Street and Howard Avenue was built by the parishioners themselves, many of whom were skilled stonemasons and carpenters. With the influx of German Catholic immigrants into Schuylkill County, the parish soon increased tremendously. In 1869, construction on the present church began, and it was finished in 1872. It towers over the landscape of Mahantongo Street in Pottsville.

In 1878, Father Frederick W. Longinus was appointed rector of the church. Father Longinus was well respected and loved by the parish, where he remained as rector until his death in 1932. In 1905, the original St. John's at Fourth and Howard, which was no longer in use, was sold to the Italian Catholic community, and became St. Joseph's Church.

== Points of interest ==
Included in the present St. John's are priceless stained glass windows by the German artisan Wilhelm Derrix. These windows are valued to be worth over two million dollars. Also included in the church are valuable statues imported from Germany over 100 years ago.

== Cemetery ==
The original cemetery, which dates back to the founding of the parish in 1841, is located at 8th & Pierce Streets. Unfortunately, many of the inscriptions on the headstones are worn away and barely visible. The present cemetery, located at 20th & Mahantongo Streets, however, is in excellent condition. In the center of the cemetery is a large crucifix, which stands over the grave of the beloved Fr. Longinus. A plaque at the base of the crucifix reads: "Es ist ein Heilger und Heilsamer gedanke, fuer die Verstorbenen zu beten auf dass Sie von Ihren Suenden erloest werden".

The inscription comes from the Books of the Maccabees, and was inscribed to remind parishioners to pray for the Holy Souls in Purgatory.

== See also ==
- List of churches in Pottsville, Pennsylvania
