= Cloud Home =

Historic house in Pennsylvania, United States

- U.S. National Register of Historic Places
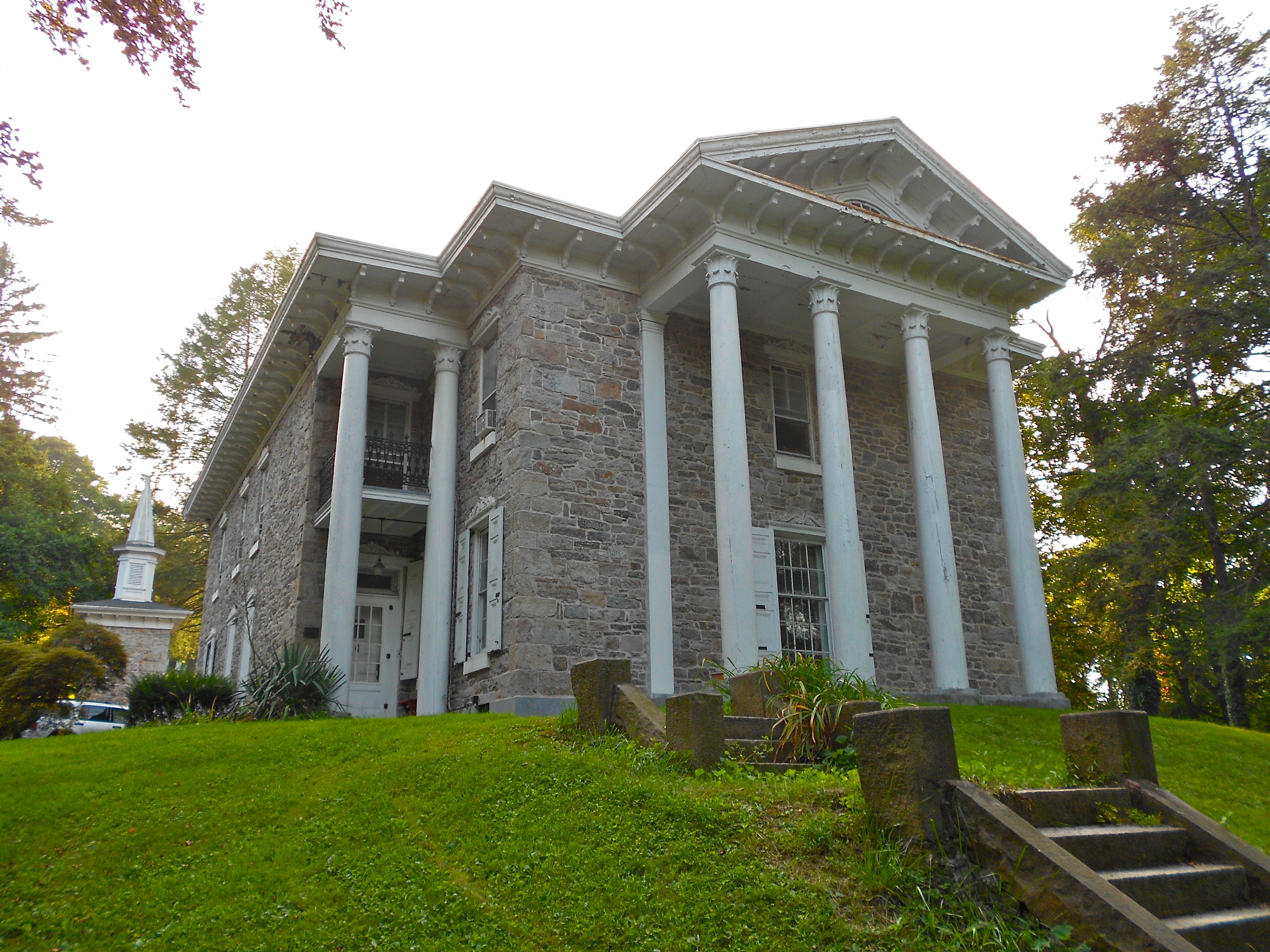

- Location within Pennsylvania Location within the United States
- Location: 351 S. 2nd St., Pottsville, Pennsylvania
- Coordinates: 40°40′49″N 76°11′42″W
- Area: 7 acres (2.8 ha)
- Built: 1851
- Built by: Bannan, Sarah
- Architectural style: Greek Revival
- NRHP reference No.: 78002465
- Added to NRHP: May 22, 1978

"Cloud Home" is a historic home located at Pottsville, Schuylkill County, Pennsylvania. It is a 2 1/2-story fieldstone dwelling in the Greek Revival style. It features a pedimented portico supported by four Corinthian order columns. Surrounding the home are seven acres of landscaped grounds. Located on the property are a contributing large stone barn, stone smokehouse with matching necessary, and an octagonal stone building with subterranean vault. This building was used as John Bannans legal office.

The home was built by John Bannan, a local attorney, and his wife Sarah Ridgeway Bannan. The property was deeded to the family in 1826 and the mansion was built in 1851–52.

It was added to the National Register of Historic Places in 1978.

Currently the home is owned by Friendship House, an organization for housing at risk youth, and is used as a boys home.
