= Mahantongo =

"Mahantongo" is a Lenape word, translated "where we had plenty of meat to eat" or "good hunting grounds." The name is shared by a creek, a valley, and a mountain in central Pennsylvania, and is a common street name in the area. The alternate spelling "Mahantango" is often found in early publications, e.g., (Floyd 1911).

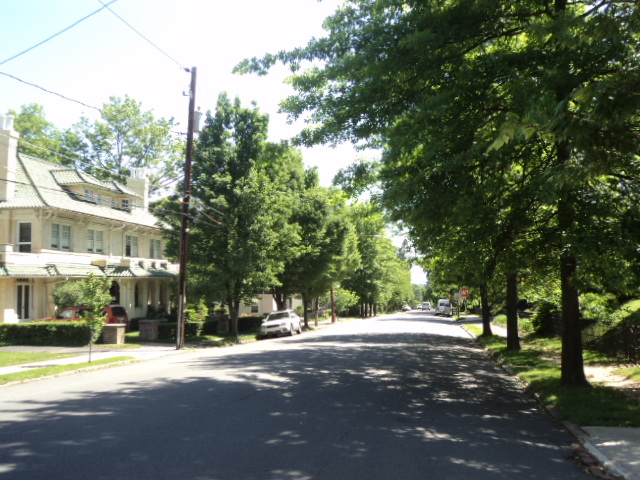
Mahantongo Street

== The Mahantongo culture ==
The Mahantongo culture area is much more extensive than the creek valley itself. It straddles Schuylkill, Northumberland, and Dauphin Counties, including several adjoining valleys, among them the Lykens or Hegins Valley to the South, and the Schwaben Creek and Mahanoy Creek valleys to the North. The part of this area that is now included in Schuylkill County was in the first decade of the nineteenth century a huge township called Mahantongo Township.

Until 1811, when Schuylkill County, Pennsylvania was set off, Mahantongo Township was part of Berks County, and was later divided into Upper and Lower Mahantongo Townships, which in turn were divided into smaller subdivisions.

After 1800 the Mahantongo area in Schuylkill and Northumberland Counties became an important settlement point including new industrial towns that were growing up in the anthracite Coal Region to the north - including Shamokin and Mt. Carmel. Mahantongo Township, north of Blue Mountain, is now Schuylkill County.

== The Mahantongo Valley ==
Nestled in the pocket of the Blue Mountains of the Appalachian chain, the Mahantongo Valley extends east from the Susquehanna River for 17 miles. Bordered to the north by Line Mountain, once the boundary between the Commonwealth and the Indian Lands, it extends four miles to the south where the Mahantongo Mountain closes the valley. rises in the mountains of Schuylkill County, Pennsylvania

The Mahantongo Valley aesthetic has been explored in various recent studies, particularly those of Frederick S. Weiser and Mary Hammond-Sullivan who focused attention on decorated furniture made in the region. They described the highly distinctive furniture that had been created between 1798 and 1828 along the Schwaben Creek Area of the Mahantongo Valley. The decorative furniture of the region has also been featured in national publications such as Early American Homes.

Throughout the 20th century the fertile Mahantongo Valley has provided the bordering coal regions with produce. At the northeastern end of the valley where the Line and Mahantongo Mountains meet, farmers traveled to the densely populated coal towns of Shamokin, Mount Carmel, Ashland, Girardville, Shenandoah, Frackville, Mahanoy City, Minersville and others to peddle fresh produce. These traditions carry on today. Mahantongo farmers continue to retail produce locally in addition to regional wholesale distribution.

The Mahantango Valley today comprises seven townships. From west to east they include: Lower Mahanoy, Jackson, Jordan, Washington, Lower Mahantango, Upper Mahantango, and Eldred. Towns and villages from west to east include: Dalmatia, Herndon, Mandata, Pillow, Red Cross, Rebuck, Hebe, Greenbrier, Klingerstown, Leck Kill, Rough and Ready, Hepler, Pitman, and Haas. Significant State Roads through the Mahantongo Valley include SR 147 which stretches north / south from Sunbury to Harrisburg along the Susquehanna River. Also near the western end of the Mahantongo Valley, SR 225 progresses north / south from Shamokin to Mandata. SR 125 bisects the Upper and Lower Mahantango townships running north / south from Shamokin to Hegins. This latter route is well known for its scenic and snaking roadway over the many small hills and dells and is frequented by motorcyclists throughout the summer months.

== Mahantongo Street ==
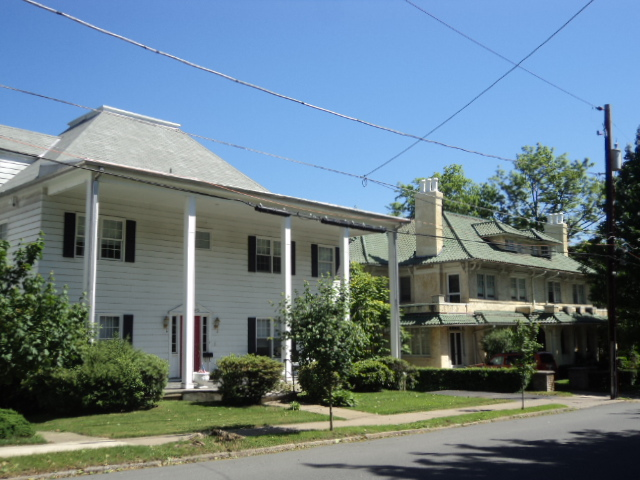

Mahantongo Street is a street with historically affluent residents in Pottsville. It is the location of the old Necho Allen hotel, the Yuengling brewery (the oldest American brewery still in operation), and the former home of novelist John O'Hara. Also located on the street are many homes of former coal barons and the famous Yuengling Mansion, now the Schuylkill County Art and Ethnic Center. Saint Patrick Church, founded in 1827, is located here. St. John the Baptist Roman Catholic Church, Yuengling Park, various Protestant denomination churches also grace this tree-lined street. Pottsville Rotary Little League field is at 20th & Mahantongo Streets. The street comes to an end in a residential neighborhood just after 26th Street. John O'Hara mentions this street in many of his books renaming it "Lantenengo Street."
