= Pottsville, Pennsylvania =

City in Pennsylvania, US

Pottsville
- City
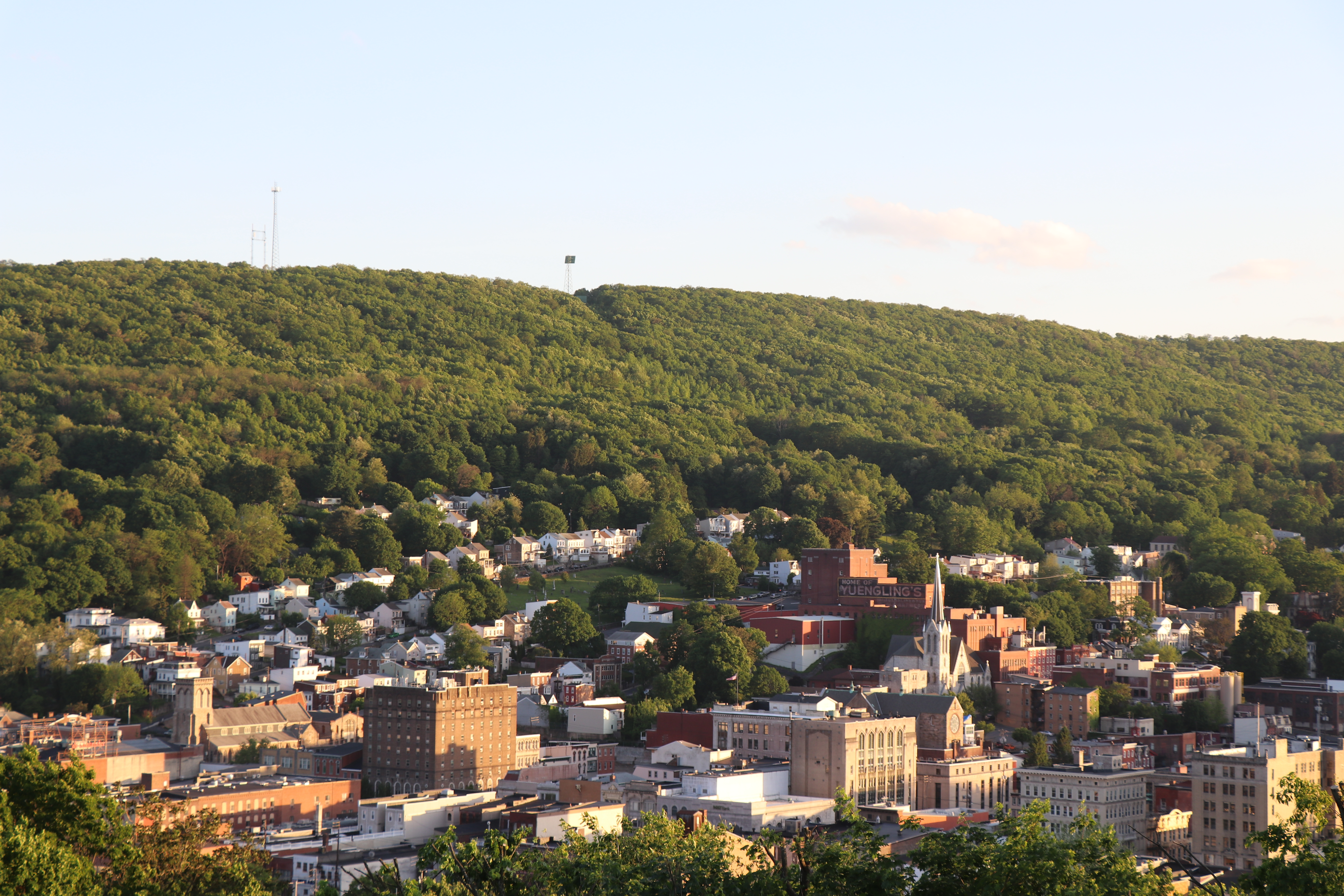
- Pottsville skyline in May 2019

- Flag Seal

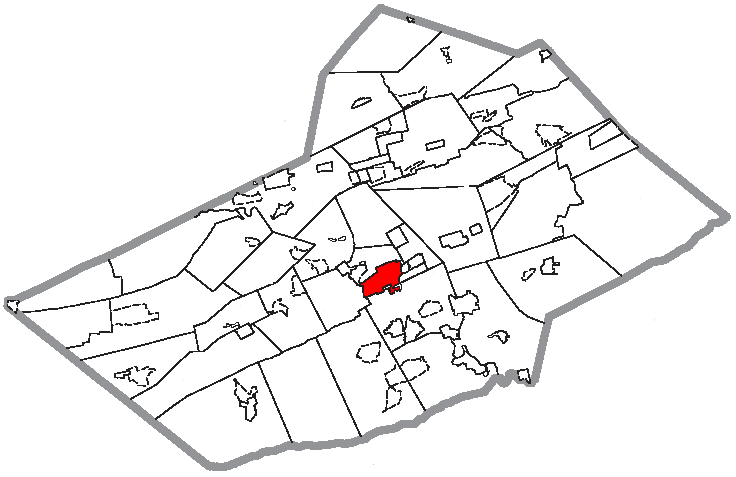
- Location of Pottsville in Schuylkill County, Pennsylvania

- Location of Pottsville in Pennsylvania Pottsville (the United States)
- Coordinates: 40°41′6″N 76°12′10″W
- Country: United States
- State: Pennsylvania
- County: Schuylkill
- Mayor: Thomas B. Smith (R)
- Founded: 1806, by John Pott
- Established as a Village: 1819 in Norwegian Township
- Incorporated as a Borough: February 19, 1828
- Chartered as a City: March 22, 1911

Area
  - Total: 4.17 sq mi (10.79 km^{2})
  - Land: 4.17 sq mi (10.79 km^{2})
  - Water: 0 sq mi (0.00 km^{2})
- Elevation: 659 ft (200.9 m)

Population (2020)
  - Total: 13,346
  - Density: 3,203.8/sq mi (1,237.01/km^{2})
- Time zone: UTC−5 (EST)
  - Summer (DST): UTC−4 (EDT)
- ZIP Code: 17901
- Area codes: 570 and 272
- FIPS code: 42-62432
- Website: www.pottsvillepa.gov

Pottsville is a city in and the county seat of Schuylkill County, Pennsylvania, United States. The population was 13,346 at the 2020 census, and is the principal city of the Pottsville, PA Micropolitan Statistical Area. The city lies along the west bank of the Schuylkill River, 52 miles (84 km) south of Wilkes-Barre. It is located in Pennsylvania's Coal Region.

Pottsville is located 47.4 miles (76.3 km) west of Allentown, 96.6 miles (155.5 km) northwest of Philadelphia, and 135 miles (217 km) west of New York City.

== History ==
=== 18th century ===
King Charles II granted the land that would eventually become Pottsville to William Penn. This grant comprised all lands west and south of the Delaware and Schuylkill Rivers; present-day Pottsville was originally in Chester County. When the legislative Council, on May 10, 1729, enacted the law erecting Lancaster County, which included all the lands of the Province lying westward of a straight line drawn northeasterly from the headwaters of Octoraro Creek (near the southern borders) marked with blazed trees, to the Schuylkill River, then this placed Pottsville in Lancaster County. By enactment of the same Council, approved on March 11, 1752, Berks County was erected; this placed Pottsville within the limits of that county.

Pottsville's anthracite coal history began in 1790 when a coal seam was discovered by hunter Necho Allen. Legend has it that Allen fell asleep at the base of the Broad Mountain and woke to the sight of a large fire; his campfire had ignited an outcropping of coal. By 1795 an anthracite-fired finery forge was established on the Schuylkill River.

=== 19th century ===
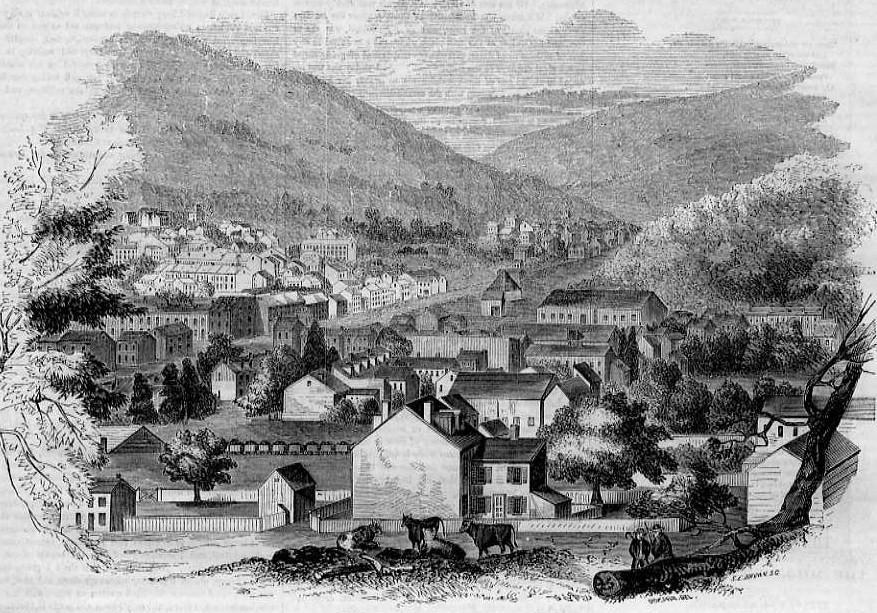
An illustration of Pottsville in 1854

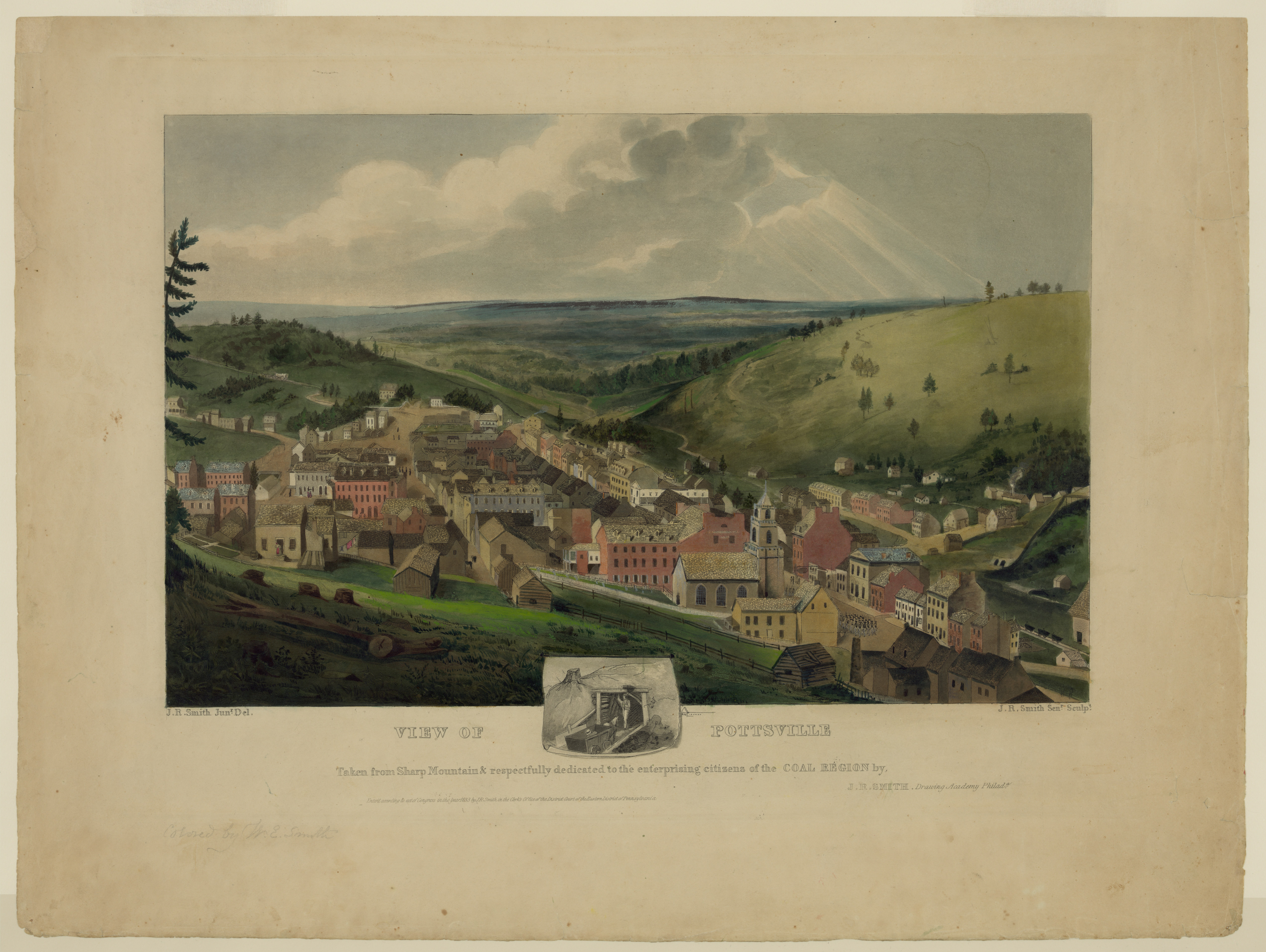
An 1833 portrait of Pottsville by John Rowson Smith

In 1806, John Pott, the founder of Pottsville, purchased the forge. By an act of Assembly of the Commonwealth approved March 1, 1811, the County of Schuylkill was erected out of portions of Berks and Northampton; this placed the site of Pottsville in Schuylkill County. The town was formally laid out in 1816 by a local surveyor, Henry Donnell. Pottsville was established as a village in Norwegian Township in 1819 and incorporated as a borough on February 19, 1828.

In 1829, D.G. Yuengling & Son established what is now the oldest brewery in the United States. In 1851, Pottsville became the county seat of Schuylkill County, replacing the original county seat of Orwigsburg.

The Philadelphia and Reading Coal and Iron Company, which has its roots in the Philadelphia and Reading Railway Company, the remnants of which were acquired in the late 20th century by the Reading Anthracite Company, acquired extensive coal lands and would become one of the most notable of the coal companies operating in Pennsylvania until the demise of the anthracite industry after World War II.

Because of its location along the Schuylkill River, Pottsville developed a small textile industry. Out of this industry grew the Phillips Van Heusen company which was founded in 1881. Moses Phillips and his wife Endel began sewing shirts by hand and selling them from pushcarts to the local coal miners. Van Heusen and other textile companies left the region starting in the late 1970s, mainly as a result of foreign competition. Another element of the textile industry was the Tilt Silk Mill on Twelfth Street, which produced silk from silk worms imported from China which fed on mulberry trees in the building's solarium. The silk business eventually was eclipsed by the development of nylon stockings. The building still stands and is presently the headquarters of a storage and vehicle rental business.

=== 20th century ===
During the Prohibition period in the United States, under the 18th Amendment, Yuengling all but stopped making beer and moved to production of near beer. The three brews produced in this time were the Yuengling Special, the company's most popular brand, Yuengling Por-Tor (a version of their "celebrated Pottsville Porter"), and finally, the Yuengling Juvo, which was a cereal beverage. They were allowed a limited production of porter on the grounds that it had medicinal qualities. Then-owner Frank Yuengling also opened the Yuengling Dairy, which produced ice cream and other dairy products for the local area. These ventures helped to keep the company afloat during that period.

When the 18th Amendment was repealed, Yuengling stopped production of "near beer" and resumed making alcoholic beverages. The brewery famously sent a truckload of its Winner Beer to the White House in 1933 as thanks to President Franklin D. Roosevelt for the repeal of Prohibition. Yuengling still continues its family-owned business today and is the second largest American-owned brewery. The Yuengling Dairy was operated by a different branch of the family from the Brewery. Business declined and the dairy folded as of 1985. Attempted buyouts by large conglomerate breweries have all been unsuccessful.

Pottsville was chartered as a third-class city on March 22, 1911.

Pottsville was host to a National Football League franchise from 1925 to 1928. The Pottsville Maroons played in Sportsman's Park (or Minersville Park) in nearby Minersville, now the site of King's Village shopping plaza. The Maroons posted some of the best records in the NFL during the 1925 and 1926 seasons. The Maroons had a claim to the 1925 NFL championship, but because of a controversial decision by NFL President Joe Carr, the title was instead awarded to the Chicago Cardinals. The Maroons suffered two more losing seasons before relocating to Boston and becoming the Boston Bulldogs. The Bulldogs folded in 1929.

Until the middle of the 20th century, Pottsville was a popular destination for many traveling acts and vaudeville performers. The 1929 film Berth Marks stars the comedy legends Laurel and Hardy as they attempt to reach Pottsville by train for one of their booked performances. Pearl Bailey had once resided in Pottsville during the early part of her entertaining career. Soldiers in training at nearby Fort Indiantown Gap were prohibited from visiting Pottsville during most of World War II due to the large numbers of illicit venues and activities present during the time.

=== 21st century ===
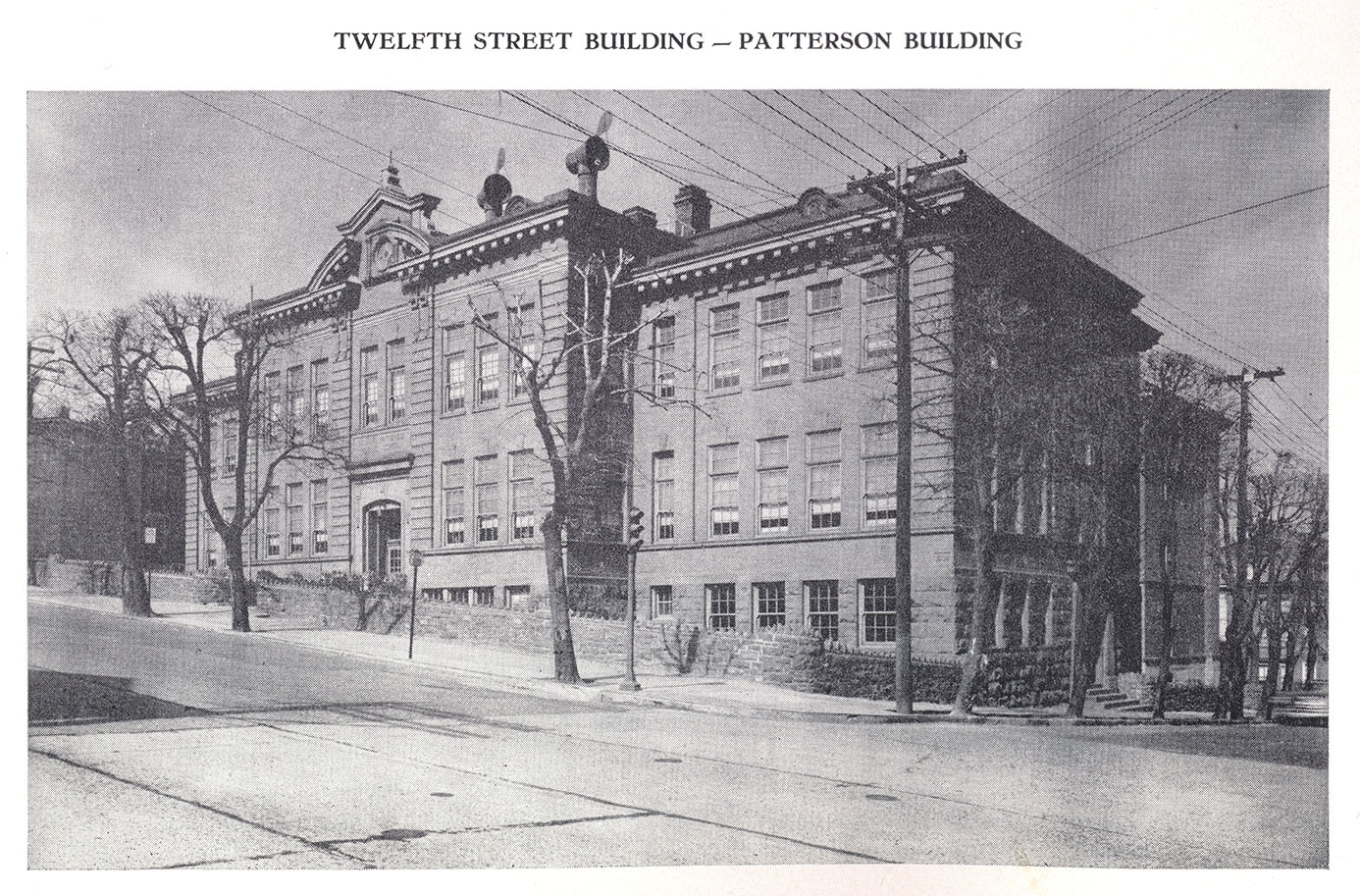
The Patterson Building served as the Pottsville Area High School from 1916 to 1933.

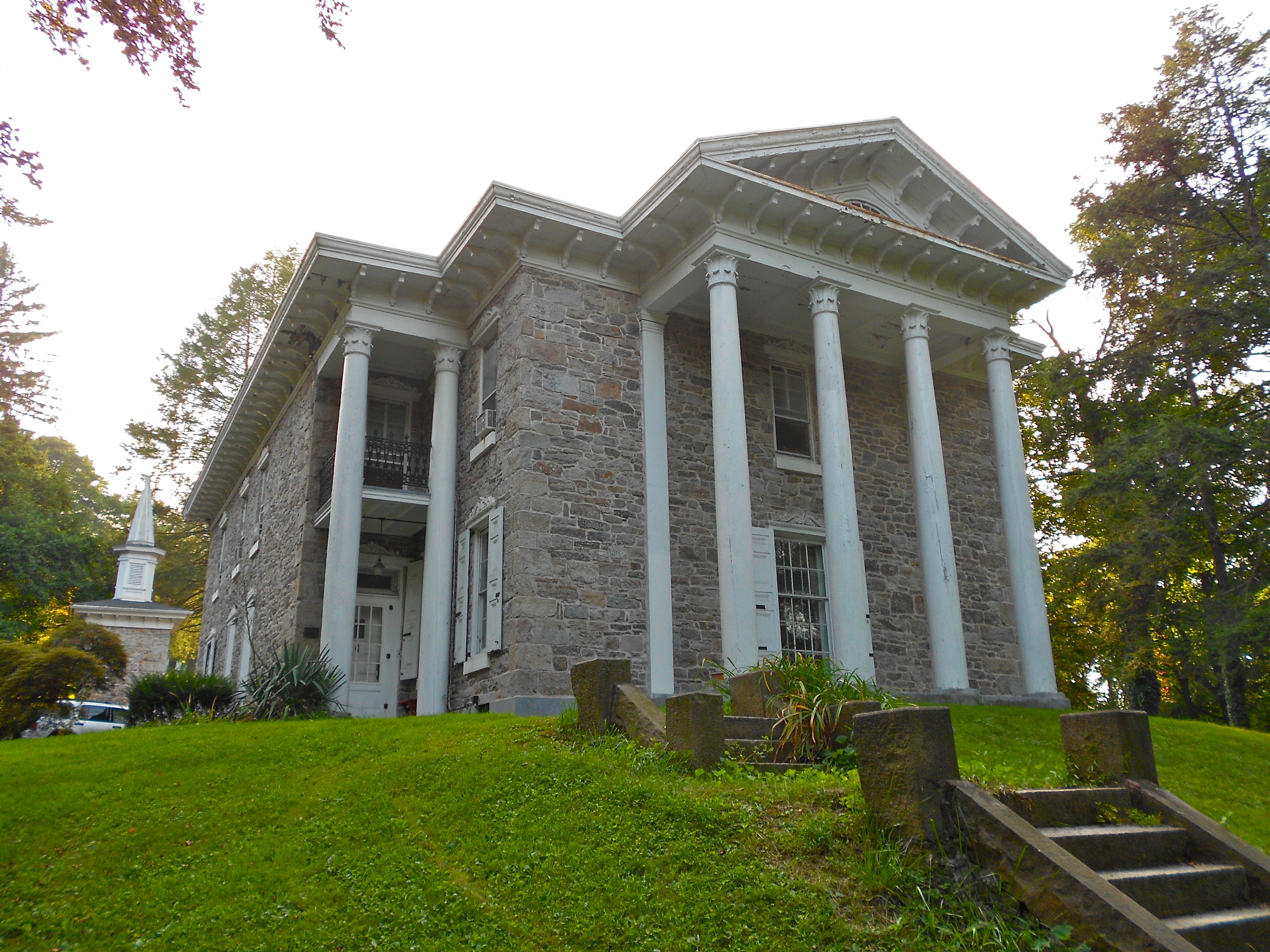
Cloud Home is listed on the National Register of Historic Places.

The city completed a streetscaping project in 2007 on Centre Street. In June 2011, the City of Pottsville became the county's transportation hub for Schuylkill Transportation System (STS) bus service throughout the county with the $16.1 million Union Station Intermodal Transit Center at 300 South Centre Street. It also accommodates Trailways and Greyhound bus services.

The Pottsville Downtown Historic District, Cloud Home, John O'Hara House, Burd Patterson House, Pottsville Armory, D.G. Yuengling and Son Brewing Complex, and Frank D. Yuengling Mansion are listed on the National Register of Historic Places.

== Geography ==
=== Topography ===
According to the United States Census Bureau, the city has a total area of 4.20 square miles (10.9 km^{2}), all land. Although there are no lakes within the city there are several water courses which flow through the city. The Schuylkill River flows through the extreme southern part of the city near Mount Carbon. The West Branch of the Schuylkill River makes up most of the western border of the city. Within the city itself, the West Branch of Norwegian Creek flows through the Fishbach section of the city and the East Branch of Norwegian Creek flows through the Jalappa section of the city. Joining near Progress Avenue and Terry Reiley Way they form Norwegian Creek, which flows underground through the heart of the city. The creek empties into the Schuylkill River at Mauch Chunk Street.

Like ancient Rome, Pottsville sits on seven hills: Lawton's Hill, Greenwood Hill, Bunker Hill (Sharp Mountain), Guinea Hill, Forest Hills, Cottage Hill, and Mount Hope.

The Pottsville Formation is named after the town; it is a geologic complex including coal, sandstone, and coarse conglomerate that runs along the Appalachian Mountains from Alabama to New York. Its type section is on a cut for the Pennsylvania Railroad through Sharp Mountain south of the city.

=== Climate ===
Pottsville experiences a humid subtropical climate (Cfa) according to the Köppen climate classification system if the 26.6 °F (−3.0 °C) isotherm is used, or a humid continental climate (Dfa) if the 32 °F (0 °C) isotherm is used. The record high was 104 °F (40 °C) in 2011, and the record low was −19 °F (−28 °C) in 1994. Average monthly temperatures range from 27.3 °F in January to 72.3 °F in July. The hardiness zone is 6b or 7a depending upon elevation.

Pottsville, Pennsylvania

Climate chart (precipitation, max. and min. temperature)
| J | F | M | A | M | J | J | A | S | O | N | D |
| 3.1 37 24 | 2.8 42 26 | 3.5 49 34 | 3.6 62 43 | 4.4 74 52 | 4.9 82 62 | 4.5 86 67 | 4.1 83 65 | 4.4 77 56 | 4 66 45 | 3.8 53 37 | 3.6 43 29 |
- █ Average max. and min. temperatures in °F
- █ Precipitation totals in inches
- Source: The Weather Channel
Metric conversion
| J | F | M | A | M | J | J | A | S | O | N | D |
| 79 3 −4 | 72 6 −3 | 88 9 1 | 92 17 6 | 112 23 11 | 124 28 17 | 115 30 19 | 104 28 18 | 113 25 13 | 102 19 7 | 97 12 3 | 92 6 −2 |
- █ Average max. and min. temperatures in °C
- █ Precipitation totals in mm

== Demographics ==
Historical population
| Census | Pop. | Note | %± |
|---|---|---|---|
| 1830 | 2,464 | | — |
| 1840 | 4,345 | | 76.3% |
| 1850 | 7,515 | | 73.0% |
| 1860 | 9,444 | | 25.7% |
| 1870 | 12,384 | | 31.1% |
| 1880 | 13,253 | | 7.0% |
| 1890 | 14,117 | | 6.5% |
| 1900 | 15,710 | | 11.3% |
| 1910 | 20,236 | | 28.8% |
| 1920 | 21,876 | | 8.1% |
| 1930 | 24,300 | | 11.1% |
| 1940 | 24,530 | | 0.9% |
| 1950 | 23,640 | | −3.6% |
| 1960 | 21,659 | | −8.4% |
| 1970 | 19,715 | | −9.0% |
| 1980 | 18,195 | | −7.7% |
| 1990 | 16,603 | | −8.7% |
| 2000 | 15,549 | | −6.3% |
| 2010 | 14,324 | | −7.9% |
| 2020 | 13,346 | | −6.8% |

=== 2020 census ===
As of the 2020 census, Pottsville had a population of 13,346. The median age was 43.6 years. 19.7% of residents were under the age of 18 and 21.5% of residents were 65 years of age or older. For every 100 females there were 93.1 males, and for every 100 females age 18 and over there were 90.3 males age 18 and over.

100.0% of residents lived in urban areas, while 0.0% lived in rural areas.

There were 5,691 households in Pottsville, of which 23.6% had children under the age of 18 living in them. Of all households, 33.3% were married-couple households, 23.4% were households with a male householder and no spouse or partner present, and 34.1% were households with a female householder and no spouse or partner present. About 37.9% of all households were made up of individuals and 17.1% had someone living alone who was 65 years of age or older.

There were 6,736 housing units, of which 15.5% were vacant. The homeowner vacancy rate was 3.1% and the rental vacancy rate was 12.0%.

Racial composition as of the 2020 census
| Race | Number | Percent |
|---|---|---|
| White | 11,405 | 85.5% |
| Black or African American | 609 | 4.6% |
| American Indian and Alaska Native | 31 | 0.2% |
| Asian | 99 | 0.7% |
| Native Hawaiian and Other Pacific Islander | 9 | 0.1% |
| Some other race | 302 | 2.3% |
| Two or more races | 891 | 6.7% |
| Hispanic or Latino (of any race) | 942 | 7.1% |

=== 2000 census ===
As of the 2000 census, there were 15,549 people, 6,399 households, and 3,877 families residing in the city. The population density was 3,697.4 inhabitants per square mile (1,427.6/km^{2}). There were 7,343 housing units at an average density of 1,746.1 per square mile (674.2/km^{2}). The racial makeup of the city was 95.73% White, 2.26% African American, 0.12% Native American, 0.51% Asian, 0.01% Pacific Islander, 0.53% from other races, and 0.84% from two or more races. Hispanic or Latino of any race were 1.22% of the population.

There were 6,399 households, out of which 27.3% had children under the age of 18 living with them, 41.7% were married couples living together, 13.9% had a female householder with no husband present, and 39.4% were non-families. 34.9% of all households were made up of individuals, and 17.2% had someone living alone who was 65 years of age or older. The average household size was 2.29 and the average family size was 2.97.

In the city, the population was spread out, with 22.6% under the age of 18, 7.2% from 18 to 24, 27.2% from 25 to 44, 22.1% from 45 to 64, and 20.9% who were 65 years of age or older. The median age was 40 years. For every 100 females, there were 87.3 males. For every 100 females age 18 and over, there were 83.5 males.

The median income for a household in the city was $30,137, and the median income for a family was $41,124. Males had a median income of $31,510 versus $21,433 for females. The per capita income for the city was $18,165. About 10.1% of families and 13.9% of the population were below the poverty line, including 15.4% of those under age 18 and 10.1% of those age 65 or over.

== Cityscape ==
The designation of North, South, East, and West is found at the intersection of Norwegian and Centre Streets. This means that Norwegian Street divides North and South and Centre Street divides east and west. Pottsville's numbered highway routes are 209, 61, and 901. The stretch of 209 on Centre Street is signed in the opposite direction of the compass.

=== Neighborhoods ===
- Center City (Downtown) – Area consisting of Centre Street and Market Street from Garfield Square to Line Street and from Nichols Street to Mauch Chunk Street.
- Yorkville – located on the west side of the city, west of the Pottsville Area High School and west of 16th Street to the city line. Yorkville was a borough that merged with Pottsville in the early part of the twentieth century.
- Quinntown – Along W. Market Street, south and west of Garfield Square up to 16th Street.
- Lawton's Hill – East of Route 61, north of E. Norwegian Street.
- Greenwood Hill – East of Route 61, south of E. Norwegian Street.
- The Island – The area surrounding the former site of the Atkins Brothers furnace; near Washington Street and Route 61.
- Jalappa – North of Route 61 and east of Centre Street on the north side of town.
- Fishbach – West of Jalappa, in the area between Centre Street and Peacock Street.
- Russelville – Along W. Market Street, north and west of Garfield Square up to 16th Street.
- Forest Hills – a residential development south of Mount Carbon.
  - Forest Hills West – a residential neighborhood south of Mount Carbon and west of Forest Hills.
- Bunker Hill – south of Mahantongo Street from S. 2nd Street to S. 11th Street.
- Morrisville – South Centre Street from Mauch Chunk Street to the city line with Mount Carbon borough.
- Guinea Hill – A residential neighborhood which extends north of W. Arch Street to W. Laurel Blvd. and from N. 3rd Street westward to N. 12th Street.
- Cottage Hill – North of West End Avenue from N. 20th Street to Westwood Road. Subdivided into Cottage Hill West and Cottage Hill East.
- Hillside – Cressona Road from Hotel Street to the city line.
- York Farm – North of First Avenue to Mount Hope Avenue and from N. 16th Street west to the city line. (Also includes High Park Manor)
- Mount Hope – North of Laurel Boulevard to Fairmont Avenue and from N. Second Street to North 16th Street and Walter Griffith Avenue.
- Yorktowne – East of Westwood Road along Woodglen and Yorktowne Roads.

=== Parks and recreation areas ===
- Rotary Park – Located at South 20th & Mahantongo Streets, is one of the largest recreational areas in the city. It includes Pottsville Area (Rotary) Little League which can accommodate night games. Also, the park includes a basketball court. There is also playground equipment located on the Norwegian Street side of the park. The park has a fairly large grassy area. The park lacks shade trees.
- Railway Park – Located in the Yorkville section of Pottsville at the end of First Avenue the park includes the home of former Railway Park Little League, the 1997 United States Eastern Region Champions of Little League Baseball.
- General George Joulwan East Side Park – Located on East Norwegian Street, the park is built in tiers along the hillside. In the past, the park included the East Side swimming pool; but this has been demolished and now is home to a skate park. Basketball courts and playground equipment are also located in the park.
- Henry Clay Park – Located on South Second Street, high on the hilltop overlooking the south side of Pottsville is the Henry Clay Monument. The park is relatively small with no benches or recreational equipment or fields.
- John F. Kennedy Memorial Recreation Complex – It is the city's main park. It has an entrance on York Farm Road, it also has a Parking Lot which can handle moderate numbers of vehicles, two basketball courts, four tennis courts, and one volleyball court and is home to the JFK Memorial Pool, a community, non-membership pool, it also has a jogging/walking path which connects it to nearby Railway Park.
- Yuengling Park – Located at South Tenth and Mahantongo Streets, Yuengling Park is the location of the old spring house which was used for the Brewery back in the 19th century. The park is filled with natural fountains, grass, flowers and benches and a large pavilion. The park has no playground facilities but provides a peaceful spot near the hub of the city.
- Bunker Hill Playground – Located between Schuylkill Avenue and Pierce St., the playground has updated their equipment but is a relaxing area to spend the day with the family.
- Barefield Outdoor Recreation Complex – This 3-acre (12,000 m^{2}) recreation complex is located at the corner of North Centre Street and Terry Reiley Way in Pottsville. It features a full-size basketball court, horseshoe pits, putting green, and a sand volleyball court. Use of this facility is free to the public.
- Others – There are many other playgrounds located through the city, including, 17th Street Playground, 12th Street Playground, 11th & Arch Street Playground, Race Street Playground, Peacock Street Dog Park, Jalappa Playground, Fairview Street Playground, Main Street Playground, Greenwood Hill Playground, and Forest Hills Playground.

== Points of interest ==
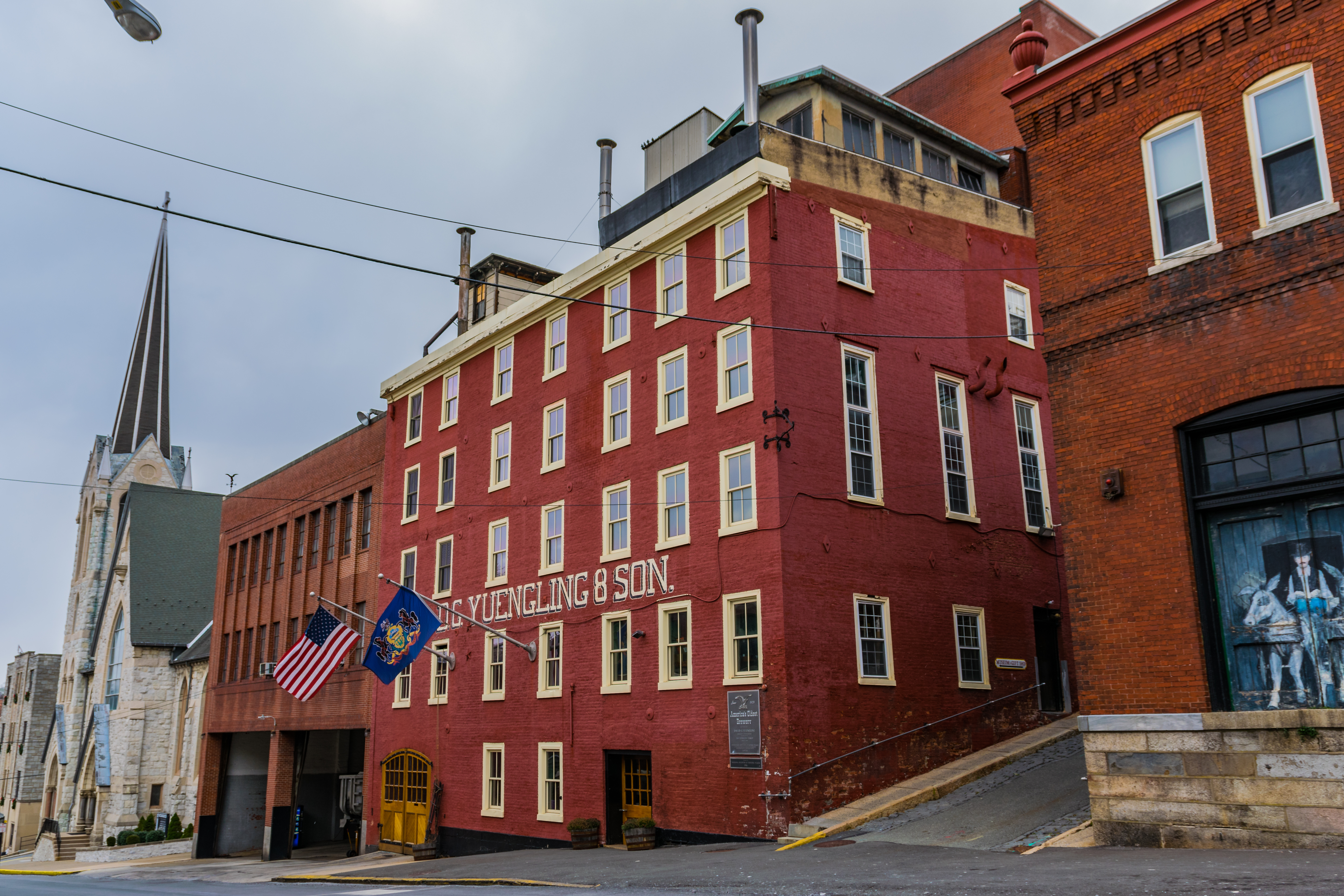
Yuengling Brewery as seen from Mahantongo Street in 2016

Pottsville has several historical points of interest, including:

- Henry Clay Monument – South 2nd Street
- Garfield Square Monuments – N. Fifth & W. Market Streets
- D.G. Yuengling & Son Brewery – (Tours Available) – S. 5th and Mahantongo Streets
- Yuengling Mansion, Schuylkill County Council for the Arts - S. 15th & Mahantongo Sts.
- Jewish Museum of Eastern Pennsylvania – 2501 West End Avenue
- General George Joulwan Monument – Joulwan Memorial Park (East Side Park) East Norwegian & Anderson Streets.
- Veterans' Memorial – General George Joulwan Park, E. Norwegian & Anderson Sts.
- Veterans' Memorial Stadium – N. 16th & Elk Avenue (Behind Pottsville Area High School).
- John O'Hara Monument – S. Centre Street and W. Howard Avenue
- John O'Hara House – 606 Mahantongo Street
- World War I Monument – W. Arch & N. 11th Sts.
- Schuylkill County Courthouse – N. Second Street & W. Laurel Blvd. (tours available)
- Schuylkill County Historical Society – N. Centre Street & W. Race Street

== Sports ==
Pottsville fielded a team in the National Football League between 1925 and 1929 called the Pottsville Maroons.

Pottsville also had two leagues associated with Little League Baseball: Pottsville (Rotary) Little League, and Railway Park Little League. Railway Park was the U.S. Eastern Regional representative in the 1997 Little League World Series. These leagues have merged to become Pottsville Area Little League.

In 1928, Pottsville played a game in New York City against the New York Giants.

== Media ==
=== Newspapers ===
The Republican Herald is the local daily newspaper serving Pottsville.

=== Broadcast media ===
The area is also served by local television stations from the Scranton/Wilkes-Barre area. They include WNEP-TV 16 (ABC), WYOU-TV 22 (CBS), WBRE-TV 28 (NBC), WVIA-TV 44 (PBS) and WOLF-TV 56 (FOX). Two radio stations broadcast from Pottsville: WAVT-FM 101.9-FM (Hot AC) and WPPA 1360-AM 105.9-FM (Talk & Sports).

== Transportation ==
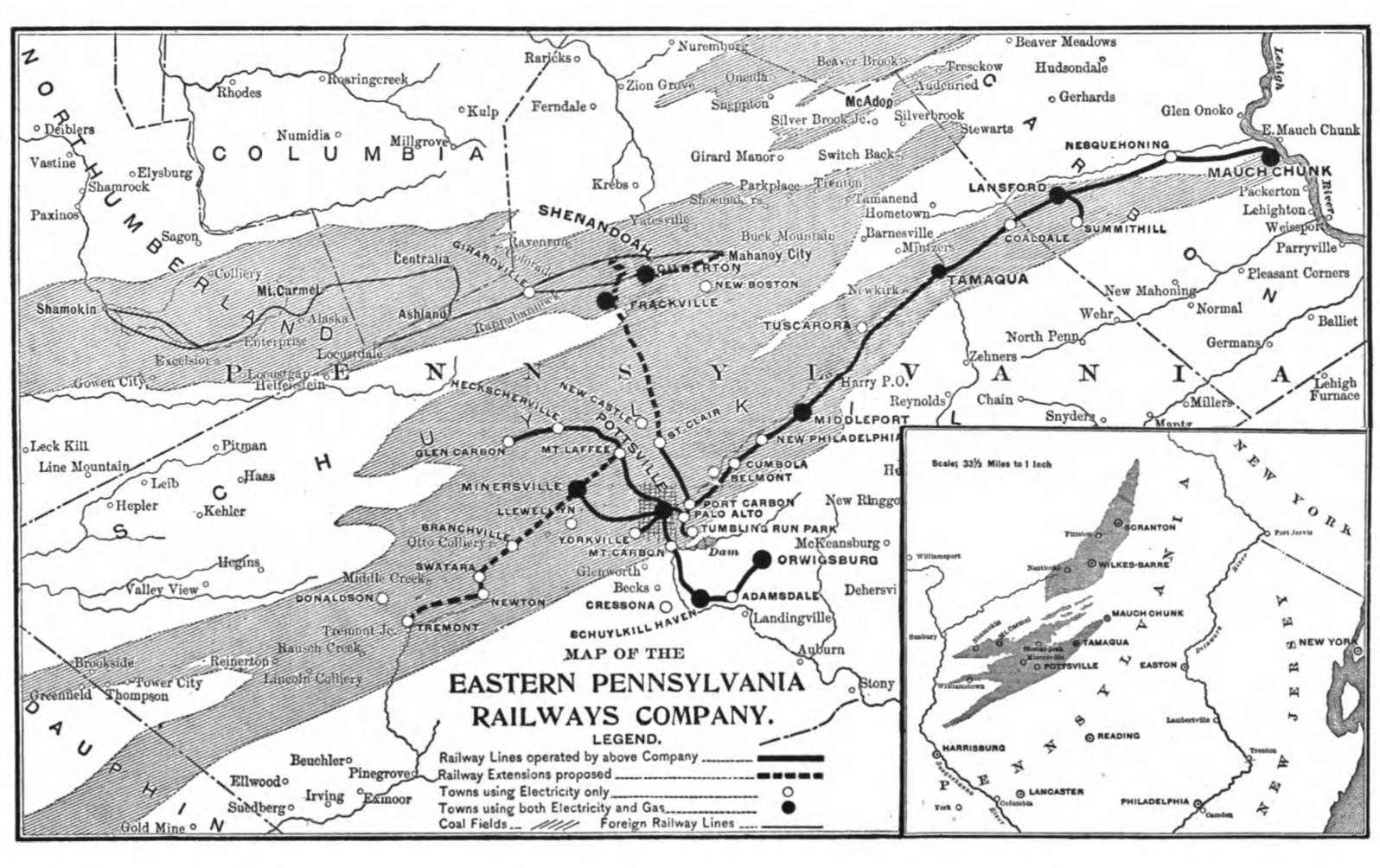
Map of the Eastern Pennsylvania Railways Company c 1912

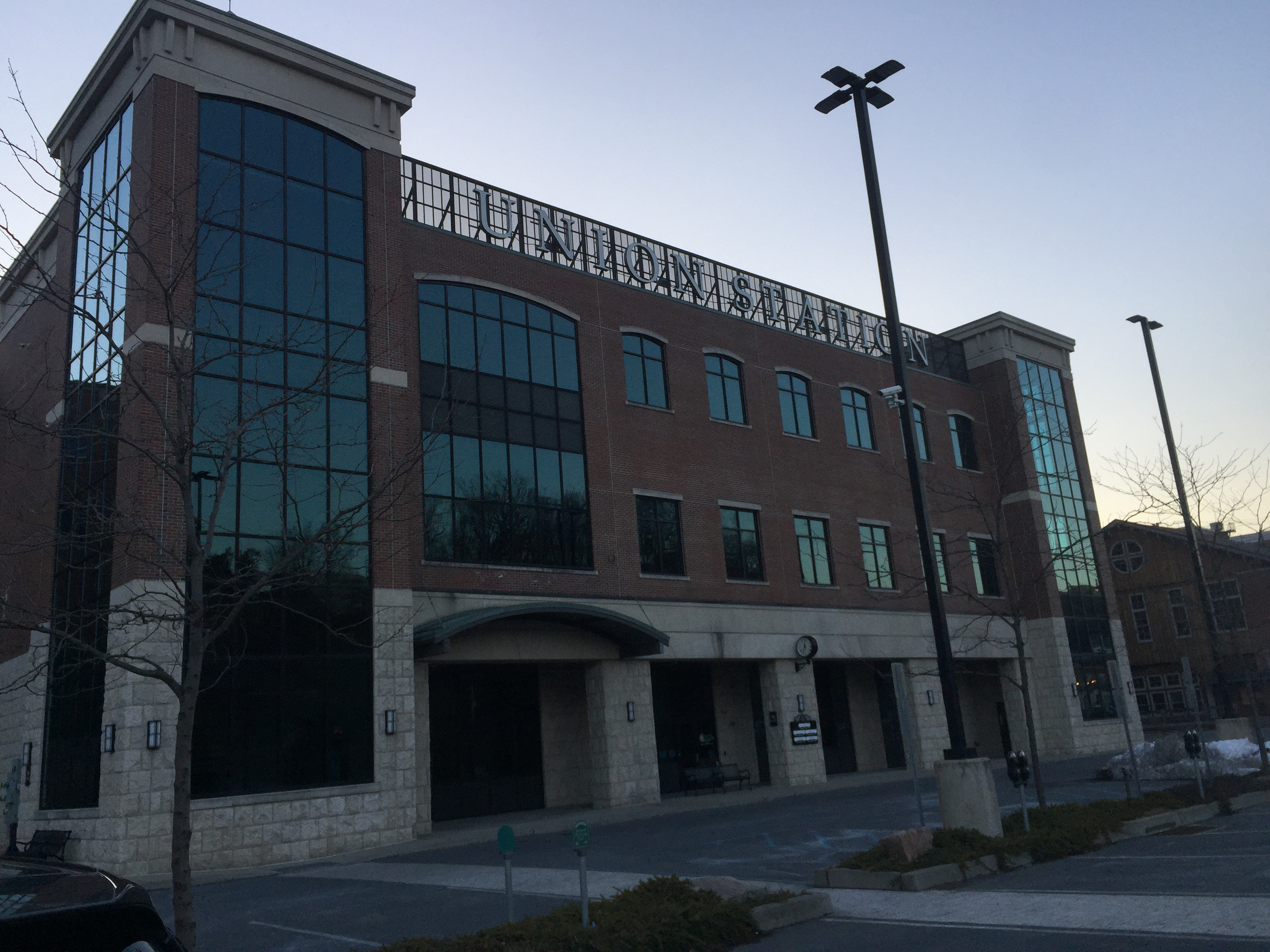
Union Station Intermodal Transit Center

Pottsville is served by a small general aviation airport, Schuylkill County Airport (ZER). Since 2011, Intercity public bus service has been provided at the Union Station Intermodal Transit Center at 300 South Centre Street. Mass transit for the greater Pottsville area is provided by Schuylkill Transportation System, which operates inter-city bus services throughout the county. The Union Station Intermodal Transit Center also accommodates Greyhound and Trailways. Two major highways converge on Pottsville, Pennsylvania Route 61 and U.S. Route 209.

Passenger train service between Pottsville, Reading, and Philadelphia was operated by Conrail under the auspices of SEPTA until July 29, 1981. The station site has since been demolished and replaced with a parking lot.

== Healthcare ==
Lehigh Valley Hospital–Schuylkill is an affiliation between two community hospitals, formerly known as Good Samaritan Regional Medical Center and Pottsville Hospital and Warne Clinic, both of which are located in Pottsville. On August 1, 2008, Schuylkill Health became the new parent organization for both facilities and their related health systems. The medical center is designated a Level III Trauma center by the Pennsylvania Trauma Systems Foundation. On September 16, 2016, Schuylkill Health became part of Lehigh Valley Health Network.

== Public and private education ==
- Pottsville Area School District, including Pottsville Area High School, D.H.H. Lengel Middle School, and John S. Clarke Elementary Center
- Assumption BVM – part of the Roman Catholic Diocese of Allentown
- Gillingham Charter School – public charter school
- Literacy Council for Schuylkill County
- Joseph F McCloskey School of Nursing at Schuylkill Health
- Nativity BVM High School – part of the Roman Catholic Diocese of Allentown
- Perception Training Center
- Pottsville Free Public Library

== Colleges and universities ==
- Alvernia University Schuylkill Satellite Campus
- Penn State Schuylkill, located in nearby Schuylkill Haven, Pennsylvania

== Cultural references ==
John O'Hara's 1934 novel Appointment in Samarra is set in a fictionalized version of Pottsville called "Gibbsville".

No More Room in Hell 2 features a fictionalized depiction of Pottsville where organized survivalists are tasked with recovering data from a medical research station overrun by zombies. The setting in Pennsylvania is a homage to the original Dawn of the Dead.

== Notable people ==
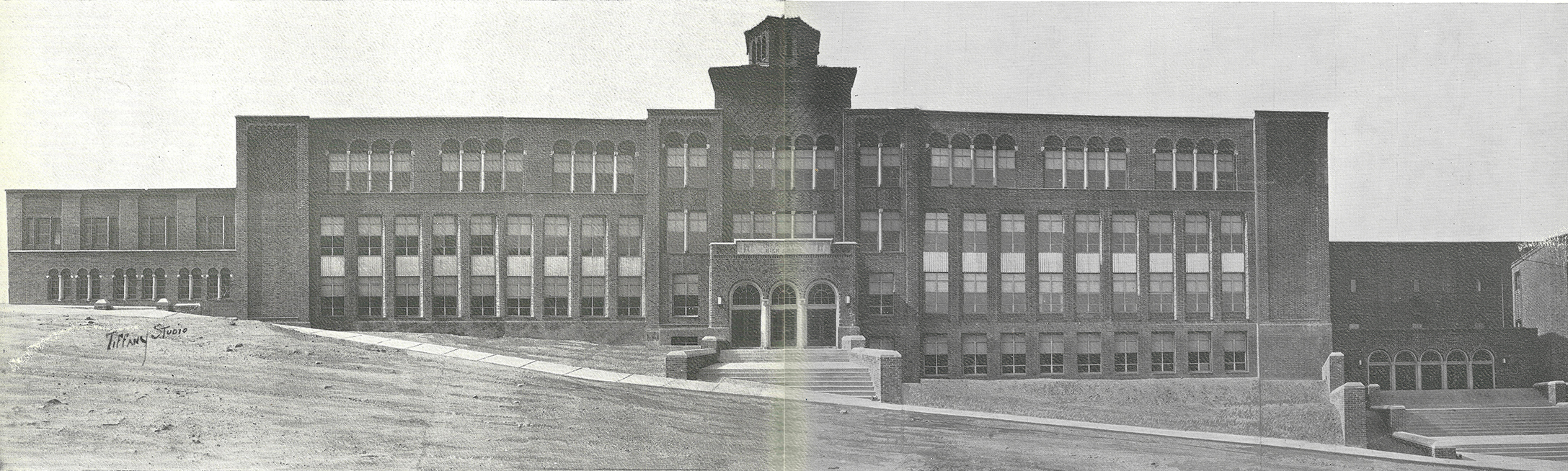
Pottsville Area High School in 1932 after its completion at its current site

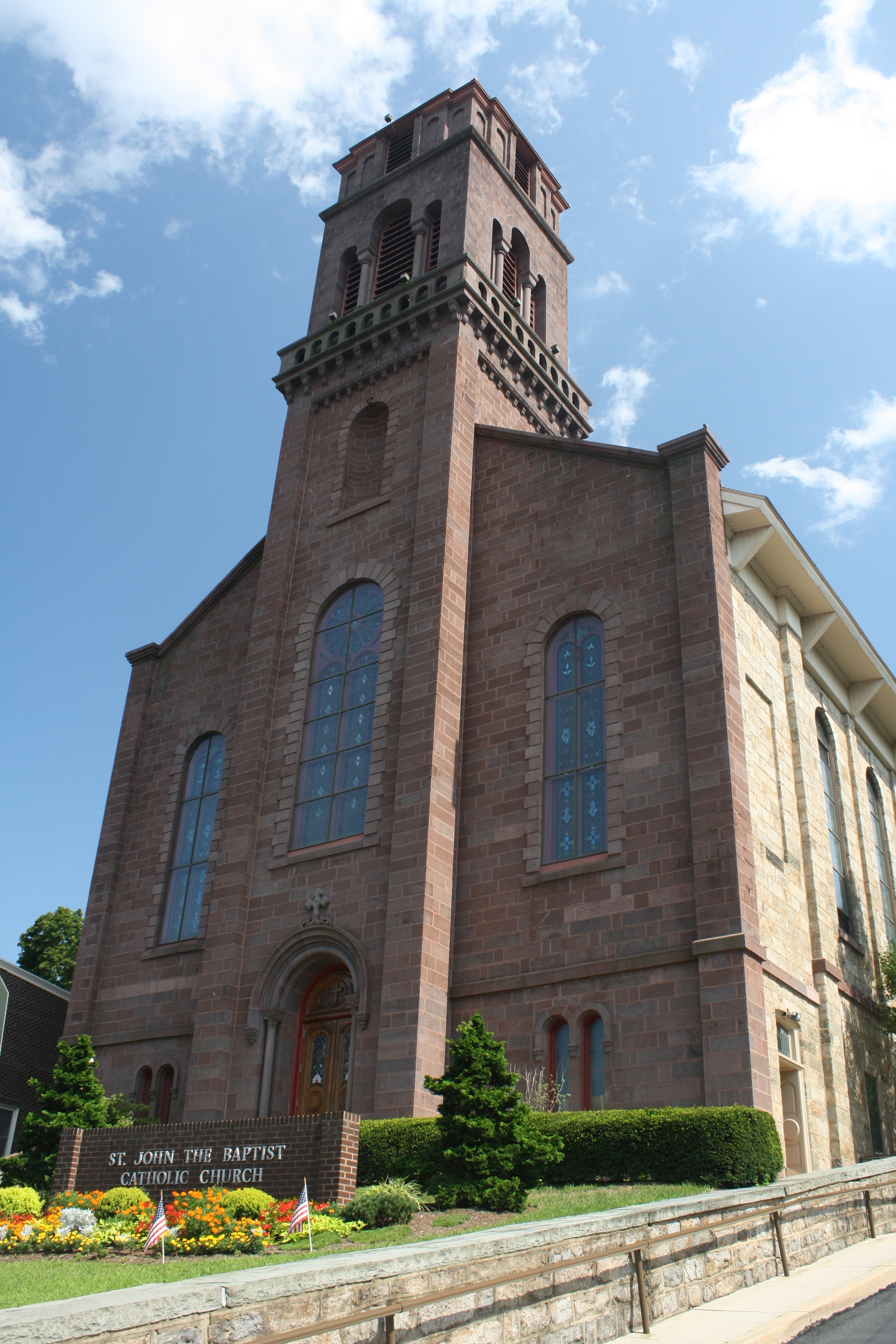
St. John the Baptist Church in Pottsville

- Gary Becker, 1992 Nobel Prize–winning economist
- Stan Bergstein, harness racing executive, member Harness Racing Hall of Fame
- Rudine Sims Bishop, educator considered the "mother of multicultural literature"
- Travis Blankenhorn, Major League Baseball Player
- Megan Brennan, United States Postmaster General
- Ralph E. Brock, first Black forester in the United States
- Antonio Buehler, civil rights leader
- Ronald Caravan, clarinetist
- George Cowie, Wisconsin politician
- Crobot, band
- Jim Detterline, American mountaineer, born in Pottsville
- Pat Flannery, men's basketball coach at Bucknell University
- Jan Fortune, Florida state legislator
- Ronald William Gainer, Eleventh Bishop of the Roman Catholic Diocese of Harrisburg
- Anna M. Hammer (1840–1910), philanthropist and temperance movement leader
- John E. Jones III, federal judge
- George Joulwan, Supreme Allied Commander, Europe from 1993 to 1997
- Guy Kratzer, Pennsylvania State Senator
- Peggy Maley, actress
- Jen Manion, professor and author
- Muffet McGraw, women's basketball coach at Notre Dame
- Chris Nabholz, baseball player
- James Nagle, Civil War general
- Arthur C. Neville, mayor of Green Bay, Wisconsin
- J. C. Neville, Wisconsin politician
- John O'Hara, author of Appointment in Samarra (which is set in a fictionalized version of Pottsville), BUtterfield 8, and Pal Joey
- Ralph Peters, author, retired U.S. Army officer, Fox News military contributor
- Henry Pleasants, engineer and Civil War general
- Lance Rautzhan, Major League Baseball pitcher
- Howie Smith, musician and educator
- Matt Wachter, musician
- Bill Walsh, author and editor
- Jude Wanniski, editor and economic advisor to Ronald Reagan
- Paige Wood, distance runner
- Benedict Churchill, bishop

== See also ==
- Pottsville Formation, a geological stratum named for the city
