= National Register of Historic Places listings in Schuylkill County, Pennsylvania =

Location of Schuylkill County in Pennsylvania

This is a list of the National Register of Historic Places listings in Schuylkill County, Pennsylvania.

This is intended to be a complete list of the properties and districts on the National Register of Historic Places in Schuylkill County, Pennsylvania, United States. The locations of National Register properties and districts for which the latitude and longitude coordinates are included below, may be seen in a map.

There are 20 properties and districts listed on the National Register in the county.

This National Park Service list is complete through NPS recent listings posted June 26, 2026.

== Current listings ==
	Name on the Register	Image	Date listed	Location	City or town	Description
1	Anthracite Bank Building	Anthracite Bank Building	September 13, 1978 (#78002469)	133 West Broad Street; 40°47′50″N 75°58′23″W	Tamaqua	
2	Cloud Home	Cloud Home	May 22, 1978 (#78002465)	351 South 2nd Street; 40°40′49″N 76°11′42″W	Pottsville	
3	Fighter's Heaven	Fighter's Heaven	August 21, 2023 (#100009238)	58 Sculps Hill Road; 40°38′16″N 76°05′41″W	Orwigsburg	Training camp built by Muhammad Ali to rest and prepare for fights
4	Mothers' Memorial, Hoffman Memorial, and Veterans' Memorial	Mothers' Memorial, Hoffman Memorial, and Veterans' Memorial	September 17, 2020 (#SG100005552)	North Hoffman Boulevard; 40°47′01″N 76°20′14″W	Ashland	
5	New Ringgold Gristmill	New Ringgold Gristmill	December 18, 1978 (#78002464)	Legislative Route 53062; 40°41′25″N 76°00′24″W	East Brunswick Township	
6	Nutting Hall	Nutting Hall	July 23, 1980 (#80003627)	205 South Tulpehocken Street; 40°32′48″N 76°23′05″W	Pine Grove	
7	John O'Hara House	John O'Hara House	May 22, 1978 (#78002466)	606 Mahantongo Street; 40°40′58″N 76°11′59″W	Pottsville	Childhood home of writer John O'Hara
8	George Ormrod House	George Ormrod House	June 14, 1977 (#77001193)	218 West Broad Street; 40°47′48″N 75°58′25″W	Tamaqua	
9	Burd Patterson House	Burd Patterson House	April 27, 1995 (#95000515)	803 Mahantongo Street; 40°40′53″N 76°12′02″W	Pottsville	
10	Pine Grove Historic District	Pine Grove Historic District	December 31, 1987 (#87002210)	South Tulpehocken and Mill Streets, and Swatara Creek; 40°32′47″N 76°23′04″W	Pine Grove	
11	Pottsville Armory	Pottsville Armory	November 14, 1991 (#91001701)	502 North Centre Street; 40°41′28″N 76°11′54″W	Pottsville	
12	Pottsville Downtown Historic District	Pottsville Downtown Historic District	March 1, 1982 (#82003819)	Roughly bounded by Laurel Boulevard, Railroad, Morris and 4th Streets; 40°40′59″N 76°11′41″W	Pottsville	
13	Reading Railroad Passenger Station–Tamaqua	Reading Railroad Passenger Station–Tamaqua	December 26, 1985 (#85003164)	Off West Broad Street; 40°47′52″N 75°58′14″W	Tamaqua	
14	St. Paul's Union Church and Cemetery	St. Paul's Union Church and Cemetery	April 27, 1995 (#95000516)	Junction of Township 798 and Legislative Route 4037, southwest corner, about 1 mile (1.6 km) east of Ringtown; 40°51′33″N 76°12′38″W	Union Township	
15	Schuylkill County Bridge No. 113	Schuylkill County Bridge No. 113	January 3, 1978 (#78002468)	West of Rock off Pennsylvania Route 895; 40°32′42″N 76°17′43″W	Washington Township	
16	Schuylkill County Bridge No. 114	Schuylkill County Bridge No. 114	January 3, 1978 (#78002467)	East of Rock off Pennsylvania Route 895; 40°32′39″N 76°19′33″W	Washington Township	
17	Swatara Furnace	Swatara Furnace	September 6, 1991 (#91001140)	Old Forge Road east of Lebanon Reservoir, north of Suedberg; 40°32′35″N 76°29′27″W	Pine Grove Township	
18	Tamaqua Historic District	Tamaqua Historic District	February 2, 2001 (#01000059)	Roughly bounded by the Odd Fellows Cemetery, Rowe and Mauch Street, East End Avenue, Mountain Avenue, and West Cottage Avenue; 40°47′59″N 75°57′29″W	Tamaqua and Schuylkill Township	
19	D.G. Yuengling and Son Brewing Complex	D.G. Yuengling and Son Brewing Complex	February 1, 1985 (#85000180)	5th and Mahantongo Streets; 40°40′57″N 76°12′22″W	Pottsville	
20	Frank D. Yuengling Mansion	Frank D. Yuengling Mansion	April 18, 1979 (#79002342)	1440 Mahantongo Street; 40°40′43″N 76°12′30″W	Pottsville	

== Former listing ==
	Name on the Register	Image	Date listed	Date removed	Location	City or town	Description
1	Mt. Pleasant Historic District		January 7, 1988 (#87002211)	October 28, 2010	Township Road 881 and Pennsylvania Route 901 at Mount Pleasant; 40°42′39″N 76°20′19″W	Foster Township	

== See also ==
- List of Pennsylvania state historical markers in Schuylkill County
