= David Frost =

English TV host and journalist (1939–2013)

Sir David Frost OBE
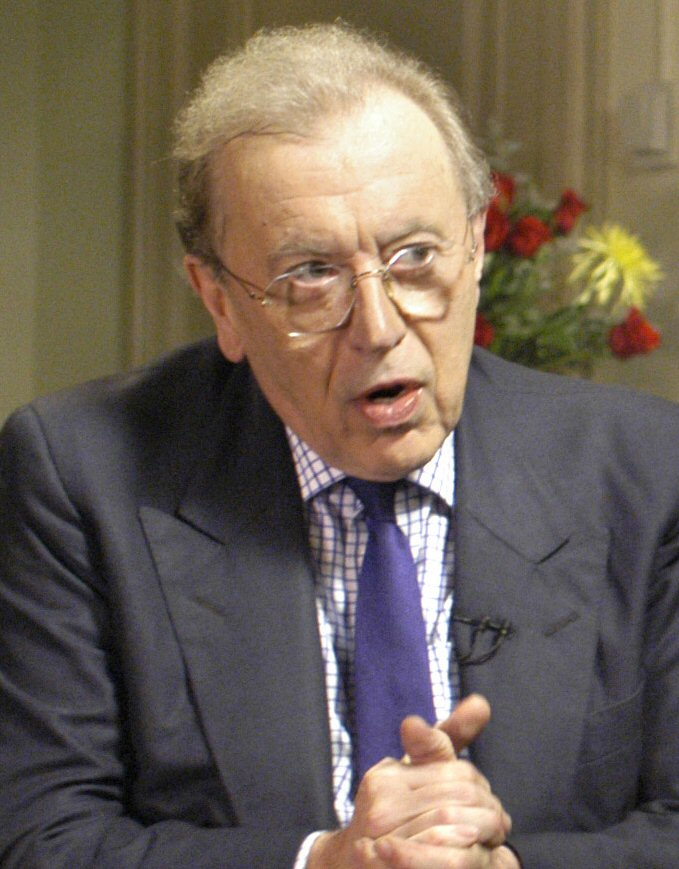
- Frost in 2005
- Born: David Paradine Frost; 7 April 1939; Tenterden, Kent, England
- Died: 31 August 2013 (aged 74); MS Queen Elizabeth, Mediterranean Sea
- Resting place: Holy Trinity Churchyard, Nuffield, Oxfordshire, England
- Education: Gonville and Caius College, Cambridge
- Occupations: Television presenter; journalist; comedian; writer
- Years active: 1962–2013
- Known for: That Was the Week That Was; Through the Keyhole; Breakfast with Frost; Frost on Sunday; TV-am; The Nixon Interviews
- Spouses: Lynne Frederick (m. 1981; div. 1982) Lady Carina Fitzalan-Howard (m. 1983)
- Partner: Diahann Carroll (1970–1973)
- Children: 3, including Wilfred

Sir David Paradine Frost (7 April 1939 – 31 August 2013) was an English television host, journalist, comedian, and writer. He rose to prominence during the satire boom in the United Kingdom when he was chosen to host the satirical television programme That Was the Week That Was in 1962. His success on this show led to work as a host on American television.

Frost became known for his television interviews with senior political figures, among them the Nixon interviews with former U.S. president Richard Nixon in 1977, which were adapted into a stage play and a film. Frost interviewed all eight British prime ministers serving from 1964 to his death in 2013, from Alec Douglas-Home to David Cameron, and all seven U.S. presidents in office from 1969 to 2008.

Frost was one of the people behind the launch of ITV station TV-am in 1983. He was the inaugural host of the US news magazine programme Inside Edition. He hosted the Sunday morning interview programme Breakfast with Frost for the BBC from 1993 to 2005, and spent two decades as host of Through the Keyhole. From 2006 to 2012, he hosted the weekly programme Frost Over the World on Al Jazeera English, and the weekly programme The Frost Interview from 2012. He received the BAFTA Fellowship from the British Academy of Film and Television Arts in 2005 and the Lifetime Achievement Award at the Emmy Awards in 2009.

Frost died on 31 August 2013, aged 74, on board the cruise ship MS Queen Elizabeth, where he had been engaged as a speaker. His memorial stone was unveiled in Poets' Corner of Westminster Abbey in March 2014.

== Early life and education ==
Frost was born in Tenterden, Kent, on 7 April 1939, the son of a Methodist minister of Huguenot descent, the Rev. Wilfred John Paradine Frost (1900–1967), and his wife, Maude Evelyn ("Mona"; 1903–1991), née Aldrich; he had two elder sisters. The name "Paradine" reflected Huguenot ancestry.

While living in Gillingham, Kent, he was taught in the Bible class of the Sunday school at his father's church (Byron Road Methodist) by David Gilmore Harvey, and subsequently started training as a Methodist local preacher, which he did not complete.

Frost attended Barnsole Road Primary School in Gillingham, St Hugh's School, Woodhall Spa, Gillingham Grammar School and finally – while residing in Raunds, Northamptonshire – Wellingborough Grammar School. Throughout his school years he was an avid football and cricket player, and was offered a contract with Nottingham Forest F.C. For two years before going to university he was a lay preacher, following his witnessing of an event presided over by Christian evangelist Billy Graham.

Frost studied at Gonville and Caius College, Cambridge, from 1958, graduating with a Third in English. He was editor of both the university's student paper, Varsity, and the literary magazine Granta. He was also secretary of the Footlights Drama Society, which included actors such as Peter Cook and John Bird. During this period Frost appeared on television for the first time in an edition of Anglia Television's Town And Gown, performing several comic characters. "The first time I stepped into a television studio", he once remembered, "it felt like home. It didn't scare me. Talking to the camera seemed the most natural thing in the world."

According to some accounts, Frost was the victim of snobbery from the group with which he associated at Cambridge, which has been confirmed by Barry Humphries. Christopher Booker, while asserting that Frost's one defining characteristic was ambition, commented that he was impossible to dislike. According to satirist John Wells, Old Etonian actor Jonathan Cecil congratulated Frost around this time for "that wonderfully silly voice" he used while performing, but then discovered that it was Frost's real voice.

After leaving university, Frost became a trainee at Associated-Rediffusion. Meanwhile, having already gained an agent, Frost performed in cabaret at the Blue Angel nightclub in Berkeley Square, London during the evenings.

== Career ==
=== 1962–1963: That Was the Week That Was ===
Frost was chosen by writer and producer Ned Sherrin to host the satirical programme That Was the Week That Was, or TW3, after Frost's flatmate John Bird suggested Sherrin should see his act at The Blue Angel. The series, which ran for less than 18 months during 1962–63, was part of the satire boom in early 1960s Britain and became a popular programme. The involvement of Frost in TW3 led to an intensification of the rivalry with Peter Cook who accused him of stealing material and dubbed Frost "the bubonic plagiarist". The new satirical magazine Private Eye also mocked him at this time. Frost visited the U.S. during the break between the two series of TW3 in the summer of 1963 and stayed with the producer of the New York City production of Beyond The Fringe. Frost was unable to swim, but still jumped into the pool, and nearly drowned until he was saved by Peter Cook. At the memorial service for Cook in 1995, Alan Bennett recalled that rescuing Frost was the one regret Cook frequently expressed.

For the first three editions of the second series in 1963, the BBC attempted to limit the team by scheduling repeats of The Third Man television series after the programme, thus preventing overruns. Frost took to reading synopses of the episodes at the end of the programme as a means of sabotage. After the BBC's Director General Hugh Greene instructed that the repeats should be abandoned, TW3 returned to being open-ended. More sombrely, on 23 November 1963, a tribute to the assassinated President John F. Kennedy, an event which had occurred the previous day, formed an entire edition of That Was the Week That Was. An American version of TW3 ran after the original British series had ended. Following a pilot episode on 10 November 1963, the 30-minute US series, also featuring Frost, ran on NBC from 10 January 1964 to May 1965. In 1985, Frost produced and hosted a television special in the same format, That Was the Year That Was, on NBC.

=== 1964–1969: Breakthrough after TW3 ===
Frost fronted various programmes following the success of TW3, including its immediate successor, Not So Much a Programme, More a Way of Life, which he co-chaired with Willie Rushton and poet P. J. Kavanagh. Screened on three evenings each week, this series was dropped after a sketch was found to be offensive to Catholics and another to the British royal family. More successful was The Frost Report, broadcast between 1966 and 1967. The show launched the television careers of John Cleese, Ronnie Barker, and Ronnie Corbett, who appeared together in the Class sketch. Frost signed for Rediffusion, the ITV weekday contractor in London, to produce a "heavier" interview-based show called The Frost Programme. Guests included Oswald Mosley and Rhodesian premier Ian Smith. His memorable dressing-down of insurance fraudster Emil Savundra, regarded as the first example of "trial by television" in the UK, led to concern from ITV executives that it might affect Savundra's right to a fair trial. Frost's introductory words for his television programmes during this period, "Hello, good evening and welcome", became his catchphrase and were often mimicked.

Frost was a member of a successful consortium, including former executives from the BBC, that bid for an ITV franchise in 1967. This became London Weekend Television, which began broadcasting in July 1968. The station began with a programming policy that was considered "highbrow" and suffered launch problems with low audience ratings and financial problems. A September 1968 meeting of the Network Programme Committee, which made decisions about the channel's scheduling, was particularly fraught, with Lew Grade expressing hatred of Frost in his presence. Frost, according to Kitty Muggeridge in 1967, had "risen without a trace."

He was involved in the station's early years as a presenter. On 20 and 21 July 1969, during the British television Apollo 11 coverage, he presented David Frost's Moon Party for LWT, a ten-hour discussion and entertainment marathon from LWT's Wembley Studios, on the night Neil Armstrong walked on the Moon. Two of his guests on this programme were British historian A. J. P. Taylor and entertainer Sammy Davis Jr. Around this time Frost interviewed Rupert Murdoch whose recently acquired Sunday newspaper, the News of the World, had just serialised the memoirs of Christine Keeler, a central figure in the Profumo scandal of 1963. For the Australian publisher, this was a bruising encounter, although Frost said that he had not intended it to be. Murdoch confessed to his biographer Michael Wolff that the incident had convinced him that Frost was "an arrogant bastard, [and] a bloody bugger".

In the late 1960s Frost began an intermittent involvement in the film industry. Setting up David Paradine Ltd in 1966, he part-financed The Rise and Rise of Michael Rimmer (1970), in which the lead character was based partly on Frost, and gained an executive producer credit. In 1976, Frost was the executive producer of the British musical film The Slipper and the Rose, retelling the story of Cinderella. Frost was the subject of This Is Your Life in January 1972 when he was surprised by Eamonn Andrews at London's Quaglino's restaurant.

=== 1968–1980: American career ===
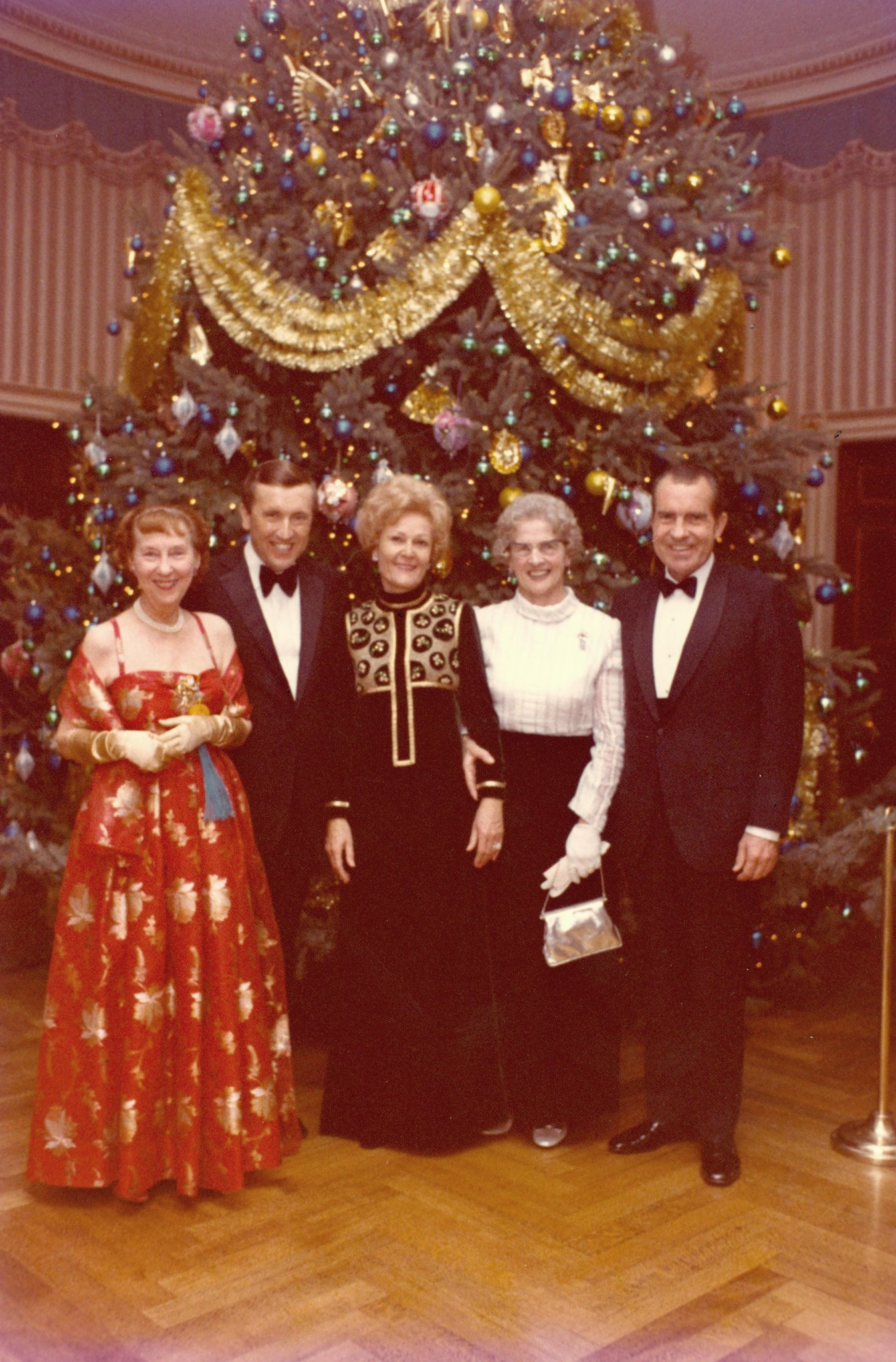
Frost with US president Richard Nixon, Pat Nixon, Mamie Eisenhower, and Mona Frost in 1970

In 1968, he signed a contract worth £125,000 to appear on American television in his own show on three evenings each week, the largest such arrangement for a British television personality at the time. From 1969 to 1972, Frost kept his London shows and fronted The David Frost Show on the Group W (U.S. Westinghouse Corporation) television stations in the U.S. His 1970 TV special, Frost on America, featured guests such as Jack Benny and Tennessee Williams.

In a declassified transcript of a 1972 telephone call between Frost and Henry Kissinger, Richard Nixon's national security advisor and secretary of state, Frost urged Kissinger to call chess Grandmaster Bobby Fischer and urge him to compete in that year's World Chess Championship. During this call, Frost revealed that he was working on a novel. Frost interviewed heavyweight boxer Muhammad Ali in 1974 at his training camp in Deer Lake, Pennsylvania before "The Rumble in the Jungle" with George Foreman. Ali remarked, "Listen David, when I meet this man, if you think the world was surprised when Nixon resigned, wait till I whip Foreman's behind."

In 1977, the Nixon interviews, which were five 90-minute interviews with former U.S. President Richard Nixon, were broadcast. Nixon was paid $600,000 plus a share of the profits for the interviews, which had to be funded by Frost himself after the U.S. television networks turned down the programme, describing it as "checkbook journalism". Frost's company negotiated its own deals to syndicate the interviews in the U.S. via the Mutual Broadcasting System and their local affiliates, as well as internationally. Frost taped around 29 hours of interviews with Nixon over four weeks. Nixon, who had previously avoided discussing his role in the Watergate scandal that had led to his resignation as president in 1974, expressed contrition saying, "I let the American people down and I have to carry that burden with me for the rest of my life". Frost asked Nixon whether the president could do something illegal in certain situations such as against antiwar groups and others if he decides "it's in the best interests of the nation or something". Nixon replied: "Well, when the president does it, that means that it is not illegal", by definition.

Following the 1979 Iranian Revolution, Frost was the last person to interview Mohammad Reza Pahlavi, the deposed Shah of Iran. The interview took place on Contadora Island in Panama in January 1980, and was broadcast by the American Broadcasting Company in the U.S. on 17 January. The Shah talks about his wealth, his illness, the SAVAK, the torture during his reign, Khomeini, his threat of extradition to Iran and draws a summary of the current situation in Iran. Frost was an organiser of the Music for UNICEF Concert at the United Nations General Assembly in 1979. Ten years later, he was hired as the anchor of new American tabloid news program Inside Edition. He was dismissed after only three weeks because of poor ratings. It seems he was "considered too high-brow for the show's low-brow format."

=== 1980–2010: Frost on Sunday and later work ===
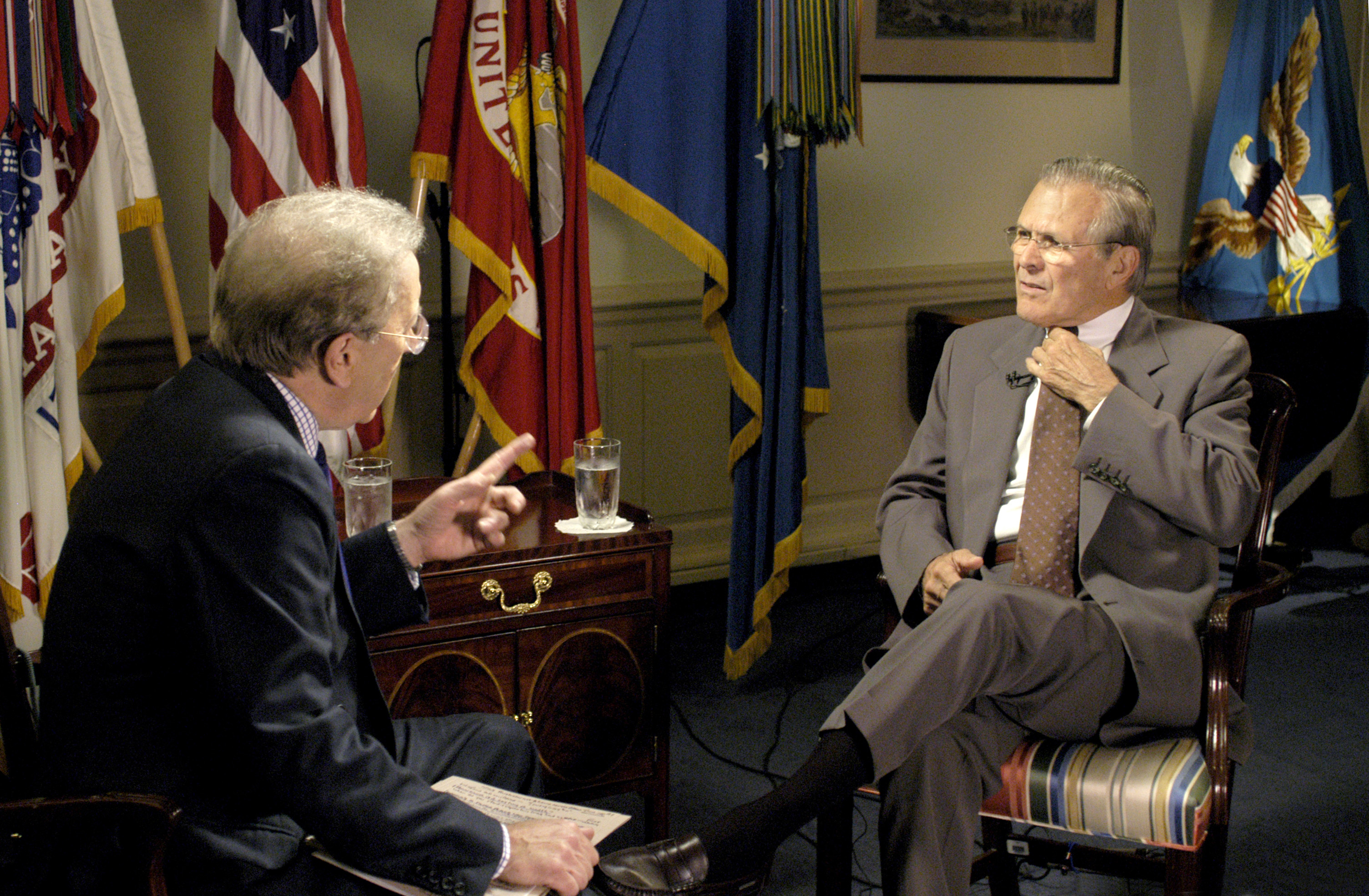
Interview for the BBC with Donald Rumsfeld in 2005

Frost was one of the "Famous Five" who launched TV-am in February 1983; however, like LWT in the late 1960s, the station began with an unsustainable "highbrow" approach. Frost remained a presenter after restructuring. Frost on Sunday began in September 1983 and continued until the station lost its franchise at the end of 1992. Frost had been part of an unsuccessful consortium, CPV-TV, with Richard Branson and other interests, which had attempted to acquire three ITV contractor franchises prior to the changes made by the Independent Television Commission in 1991. After transferring from ITV, his Sunday morning interview programme Breakfast with Frost ran on the BBC from January 1993 until 29 May 2005. For a time it ran on BSB before moving to BBC 1.

Frost hosted Through the Keyhole, which ran on several UK channels from 1987 until 2008 and also featured Loyd Grossman. Produced by his own production company, the programme was first shown in prime time and on daytime television in its later years. Frost worked for Al Jazeera English, presenting a live weekly hour-long current affairs programme, Frost Over The World, which started when the network launched in November 2006. The programme regularly made headlines with interviewees such as Tony Blair, President Omar al-Bashir of Sudan, Prime Minister Benazir Bhutto of Pakistan and President Daniel Ortega of Nicaragua. The programme was produced by the former Question Time editor and Independent on Sunday journalist Charlie Courtauld. Frost was one of the first to interview the man who authored the Fatwa on Terrorism, Muhammad Tahir-ul-Qadri.

During his career as a broadcaster, Frost became one of Concorde's most frequent fliers, having flown between London and New York an average of 20 times per year for 20 years. In 2007, Frost hosted a discussion with Libya's leader Muammar Gaddafi as part of the Monitor Group's involvement in the country. In June 2010, Frost presented Frost on Satire, an hour-long BBC Four documentary looking at the history of television satire.

== Frost/Nixon ==
Frost/Nixon was originally a play written by Peter Morgan, developed from the interviews that Frost had conducted with Richard Nixon in 1977. Frost/Nixon was presented as a stage production in London in 2006 and on Broadway in 2007. Frank Langella won the Tony Award for Best Leading Actor in a Play for his portrayal of Nixon; the play also received nominations for Best Play and Best Direction.

The 2008 film adaptation of the play was directed by Ron Howard and starred Michael Sheen as Frost and Langella as Nixon, both reprising their stage roles. It was nominated for five Golden Globe Awards, winning none: Best Motion Picture — Drama, Best Director, Best Actor (Langella), Best Screenplay, and Best Original Score. It was also nominated for five Academy Awards, again winning none: Best Picture, Best Actor (Langella), Best Director, Best Adapted Screenplay, and Best Film Editing.

In February 2009, Frost was featured on the Australian Broadcasting Corporation's international affairs programme Foreign Correspondent in a report titled "The World According To Frost", reflecting on his long career and portrayal in the film Frost/Nixon.

Frost's interviews are also the basis for a six-part docuseries, David Frost vs., that is scheduled to air on MSNBC in 2025.

== Personal life ==
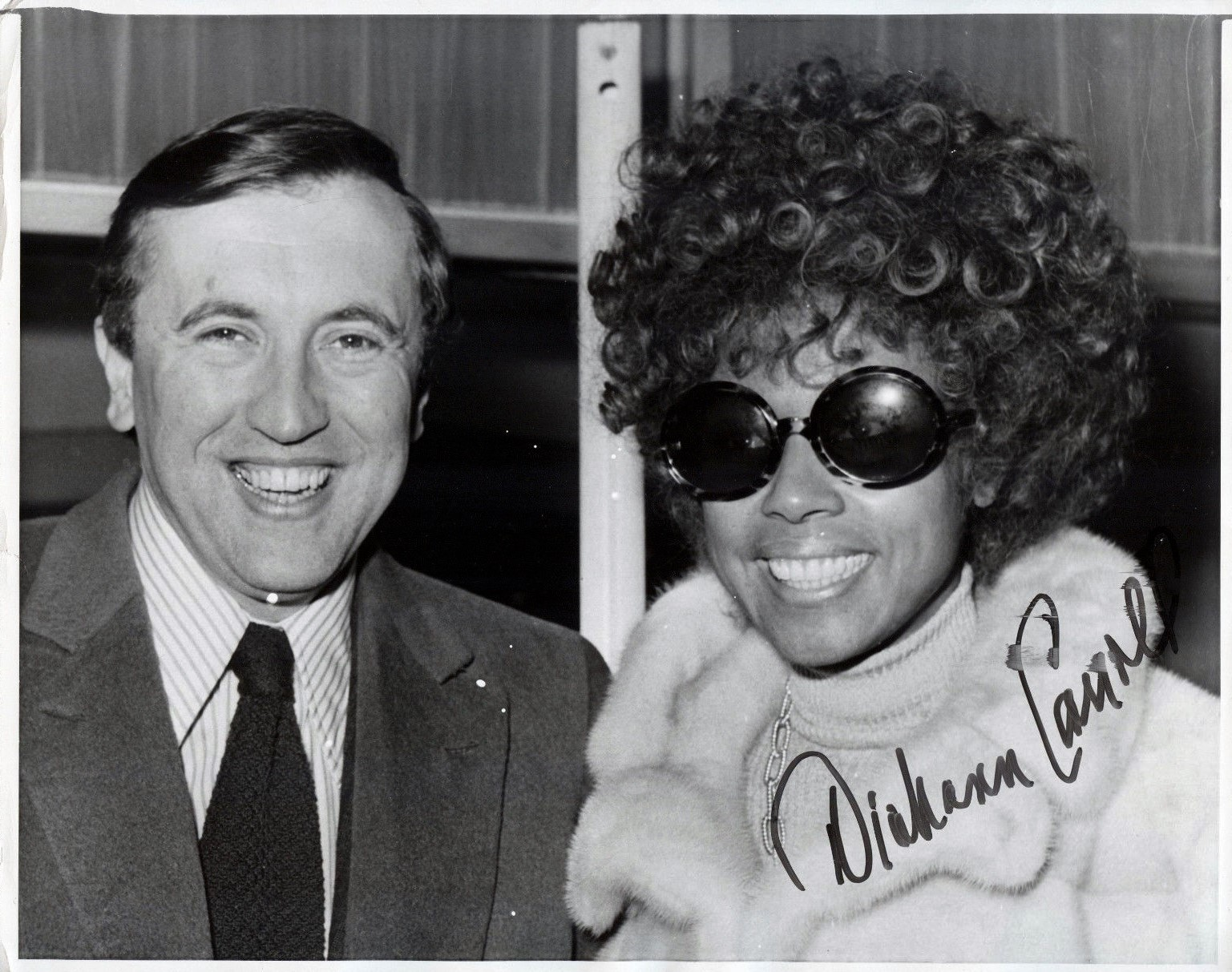
David Frost and Diahann Carroll in 1971

Frost had several relationships with high-profile women. In the mid-1960s, he dated British actress Janette Scott, between her marriages to songwriter Jackie Rae and singer Mel Tormé; from 1970 to 1973, he was engaged to American actress Diahann Carroll; in 1974, he was briefly engaged to American model Karen Graham; between 1972 and 1977 he had a relationship with British socialite Caroline Cushing; in 1981, he married Lynne Frederick, widow of Peter Sellers, but they divorced the following year. He also had an 18-year intermittent affair with American actress Carol Lynley.

On 19 March 1983, Frost married Lady Carina Fitzalan-Howard, daughter of Miles Fitzalan-Howard, 17th Duke of Norfolk. Three sons were born to the couple over the next five years. His second son, Wilfred Frost, followed in his father's footsteps and currently works as an anchor at Sky News and CNBC. They lived for many years at 22 Carlyle Square in Chelsea, London, and kept a weekend home at Michelmersh Court in Hampshire. Frost was a fan of Southampton F.C. and was part of a consortium alongside Gavyn Davies that attempted to take over the club in 1996.

== Death and tributes ==
On 31 August 2013, Frost was aboard the Cunard cruise ship MS Queen Elizabeth when he died of a heart attack, aged 74. Cunard said that the vessel had left Southampton for a ten-day cruise in the Mediterranean, ending in Rome. A post-mortem found that Frost had hypertrophic cardiomyopathy. Frost's son Miles died from the same condition at the age of 31 in 2015.

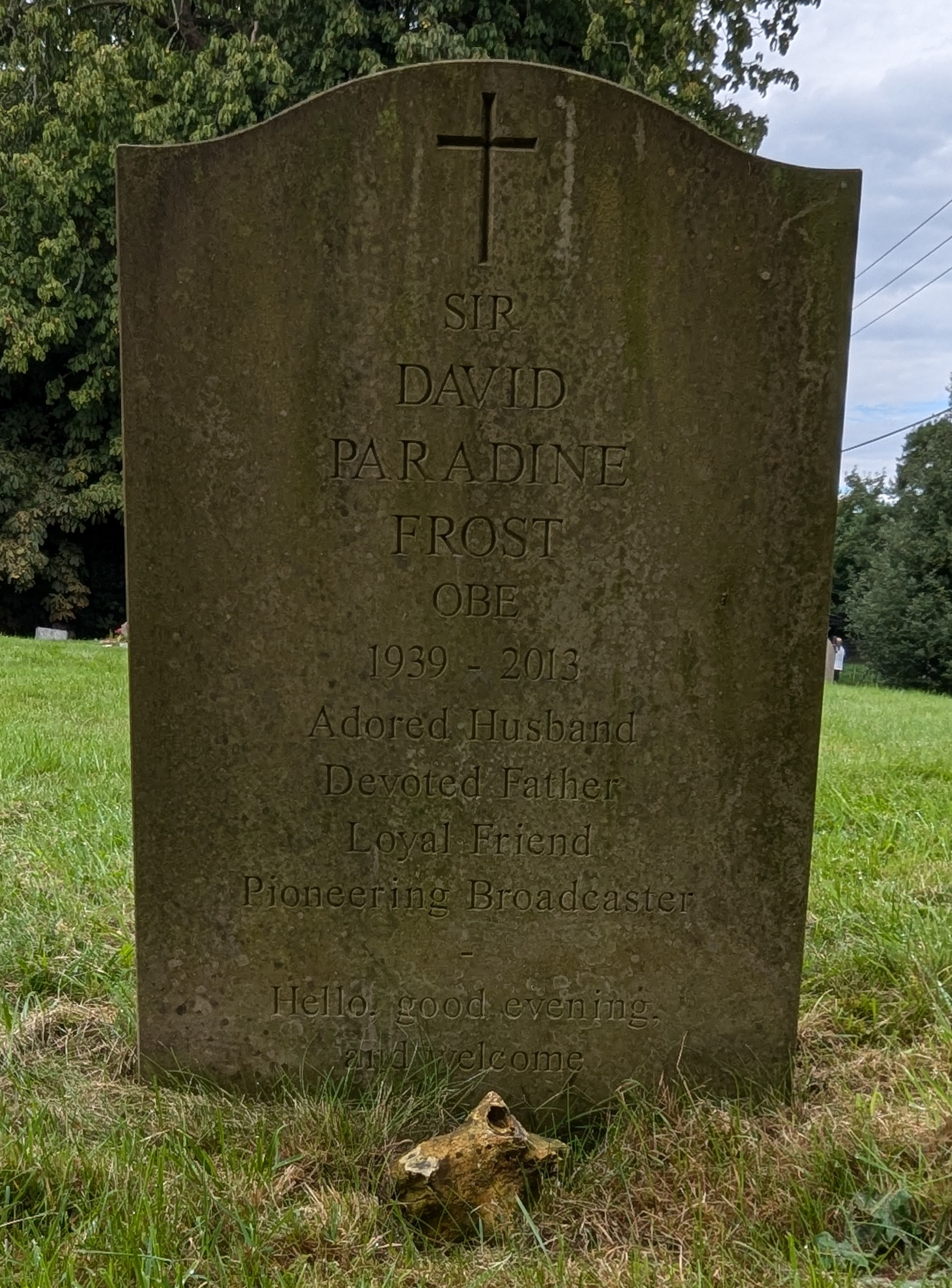
Gravestone of Sir David Frost in the graveyard of Holy Trinity Church, Nuffield, Oxfordshire, England. September 2024.

A funeral service was held at Holy Trinity Church in Nuffield, Oxfordshire, on 12 September 2013, after which he was interred in the church's graveyard. On 13 March 2014, a memorial service was held at Westminster Abbey, at which Frost was honoured with a memorial stone in Poets' Corner.

British Prime Minister David Cameron paid tribute, saying: "He could be—and certainly was with me—both a friend and a fearsome interviewer." Michael Grade commented: "He was kind of a television renaissance man. He could put his hand to anything. He could turn over Richard Nixon or he could win the comedy prize at the Montreux Golden Rose festival."

== Achievements ==
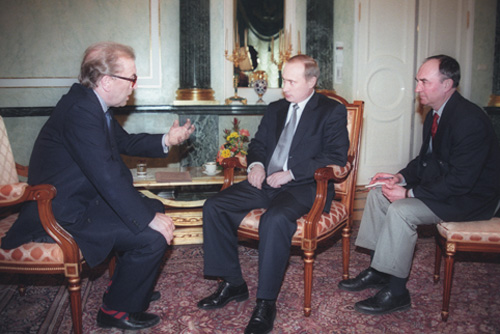
Frost interviewing Vladimir Putin for the BBC's Breakfast with Frost in March 2000

Frost was the only person to have interviewed all eight British prime ministers serving between 1964 and 2016 (Harold Wilson, Edward Heath, James Callaghan, Margaret Thatcher, John Major, Tony Blair, Gordon Brown and David Cameron) and all seven U.S. presidents in office between 1969 and 2009 (Richard Nixon, Gerald Ford, Jimmy Carter, Ronald Reagan, George H. W. Bush, Bill Clinton and George W. Bush).

He was a patron and former vice-president of the Motor Neurone Disease Association charity, as well as being a patron of the Alzheimer's Research Trust, Hearing Star Benevolent Fund, East Anglia's Children's Hospices, the Home Farm Trust and the Elton John AIDS Foundation. He was also recognised for his contributions to the women's charity "Wellbeing for Women".

Frost was estimated to be worth £200 million by the Sunday Times Rich List in 2006, a figure he considered a significant overestimate in 2011. The valuation included the assets of his main British company and subsidiaries, plus homes in London and the country.

== Awards and honours ==
- 1970: Officer of the Order of the British Empire (OBE)
- 1970: Honorary Doctor of Laws degree of Emerson College
- 1993: Knight Bachelor
- 1994: Honorary doctoral degree of the University of Sussex
- 2005: Fellowship of the British Academy of Film and Television Arts BAFTA
- 2009: Honorary Doctor of Letters degree of the University of Winchester
- 2009: Lifetime Achievement Award at the Emmy Awards

== Bibliography ==
Non-fiction

- How to Live Under Labour – or at Least Have as Much Chance as Anyone Else (1964)
- To England with Love (1968). With Antony Jay.
- The Presidential Debate, 1968: David Frost talks with Vice-President Hubert H. Humphrey (and others) (1968).
- The Americans (1970)
- Billy Graham Talks with David Frost (1972)
- Whitlam and Frost: The Full Text of Their TV Conversations Plus Exclusive New Interviews (1974)
- "I Gave Them a Sword": Behind the Scenes of the Nixon Interviews (1978). Reissued as Frost/Nixon in 2007.
- David Frost's Book of Millionaires, Multimillionaires, and Really Rich People (1984)
- The World's Shortest Books (1987)
- An Autobiography. Part 1: From Congregations to Audiences (1993)

With Michael Deakin and illustrated by Willie Rushton

- I Could Have Kicked Myself: David Frost's Book of the World's Worst Decisions (1982)
- Who Wants to Be a Millionaire? (1983)
- If You'll Believe That (1986)

With Michael Shea

- The Mid-Atlantic Companion, or, How to Misunderstand Americans as Much as They Misunderstand Us (1986)
- The Rich Tide: Men, Women, Ideas and Their Transatlantic Impact (1986)
