= Washington Township, Schuylkill County, Pennsylvania =

Township in Pennsylvania, US

Coordinates: 40°31′30″N 76°14′44″W

- Township
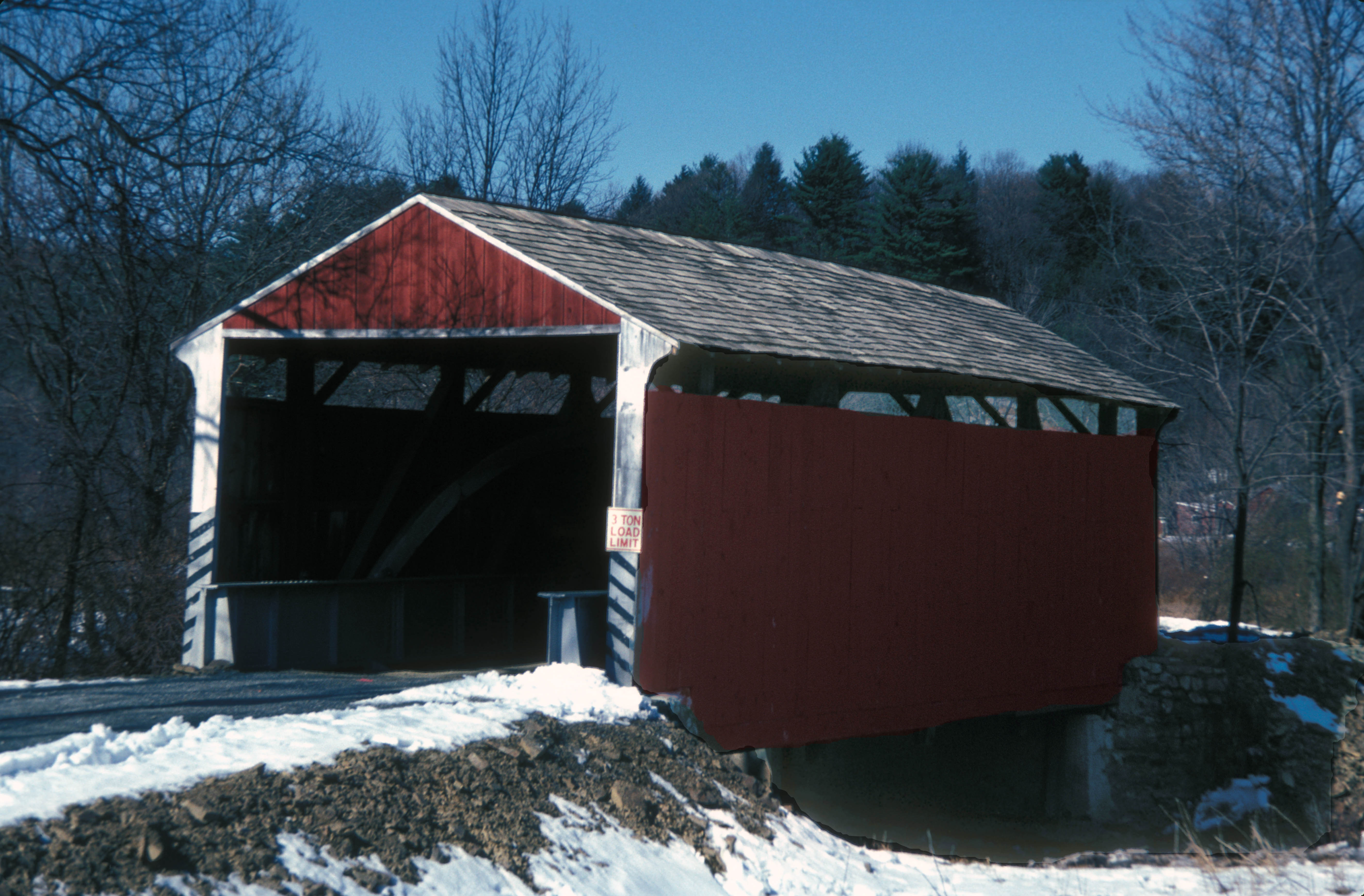
- Rock Covered Bridge

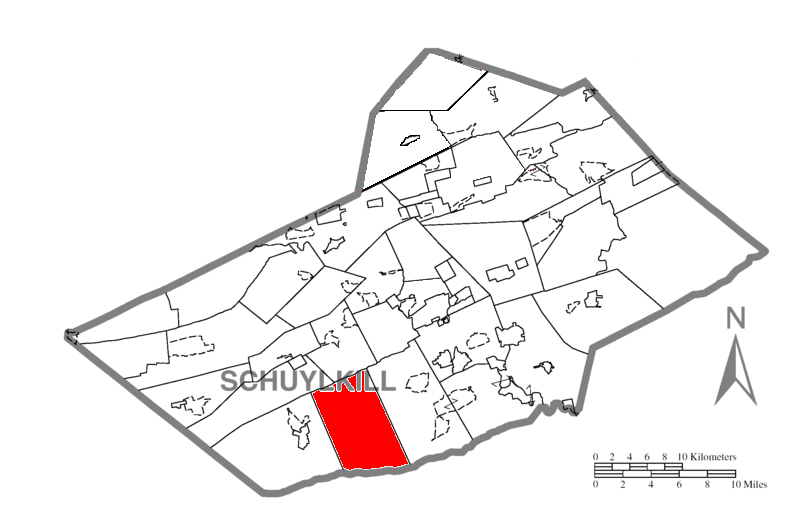
- Map of Schuylkill County, Pennsylvania Highlighting Washington Township

- Map of Schuylkill County, Pennsylvania
- Country: United States
- State: Pennsylvania
- County: Schuylkill
- Settled: 1790
- Incorporated: 1856

Area
  - Total: 31.08 sq mi (80.49 km^{2})
  - Land: 31.02 sq mi (80.33 km^{2})
  - Water: 0.062 sq mi (0.16 km^{2})

Population (2020)
  - Total: 3,134 ▲
  - Estimate (2021): 3,135
  - Density: 95/sq mi (36.5/km^{2})
- Time zone: UTC-5 (Eastern (EST))
  - Summer (DST): UTC-4 (EDT)
- FIPS code: 42-107-81312
- Website: https://washingtontownship.info/

Washington Township is a township that is located in Schuylkill County, Pennsylvania, United States. The population was 3,134 at the time of the 2020 census.

== History ==
The Schuylkill County Bridge No. 113 and Schuylkill County Bridge No. 114 are listed on the National Register of Historic Places.

== Geography ==
According to the U.S. Census Bureau, the township has a total area of 31.1 square miles (80.5 km^{2}), 31.0 square miles (80.4 km^{2}) of which is land and 0.1 square mile (0.2 km^{2}) (0.19%) of which is water.

The township is a designated part of Appalachia by the Appalachian Regional Commission. The Appalachian Mountain Range goes through Schuylkill County.

== Recreation ==
Portions of the Pennsylvania State Game Lands Number 80, through which passes the Appalachian National Scenic Trail is located in the southern portion of the township; the eastern portion of the Sweet Arrow County Lake Park is located along the western border of the township.

== Demographics ==
Historical population
Census	Pop.	Note	%±
2010	3,033		—
2020	3,134		3.3%
2021 (est.)	3,135		0.0%
U.S. Decennial Census

At the time of the 2000 census, there were 2,750 people, 1,001 households, and 785 families living in the township.

The population density was 88.6 inhabitants per square mile (34.2/km^{2}). There were 1,082 housing units at an average density of 34.9 per square mile (13.5/km^{2}).

The racial makeup of the township was 99.09% White, 0.18% African American, 0.29% Asian, 0.04% Pacific Islander, 0.07% from other races, and 0.33% from two or more races. Hispanic or Latino of any race were 0.18%.

Of the 1,001 households that were documented in this township, 36.3% had children under the age of eighteen living with them, 68.1% were married couples living together, 5.7% had a female householder with no husband present, and 21.5% were non-families. Of all of the households that were documented, 17.4% were one-person households and 7.8% were one-person households with residents who were aged sixty-five or older.

The average household size was 2.75 and the average family size was 3.11.

The age distribution was 26.1% of residents who were under the age of 18, 8.8% from 18 to 24, 29.0% from 25 to 44, 24.5% from 45 to 64, and 11.6% 65 or older. The median age was 38 years.

For every one hundred females, there were 104.9 males. For every one hundred females who were aged eighteen or older, there were 102.6 males.

The median household income was $43,493 and the median family income was $46,964. Males had a median income of $35,089 compared with that of $22,688 for females.

The per capita income for the township was $17,269.

Approximately, 4.1% of families and 5.4% of the population were living below the poverty line, including 3.7% of those who were under the age of eighteen and 13.0% of those who were aged sixty-five or older.
