= Burd Patterson House =

Historic house in Pennsylvania, United States

- U.S. National Register of Historic Places
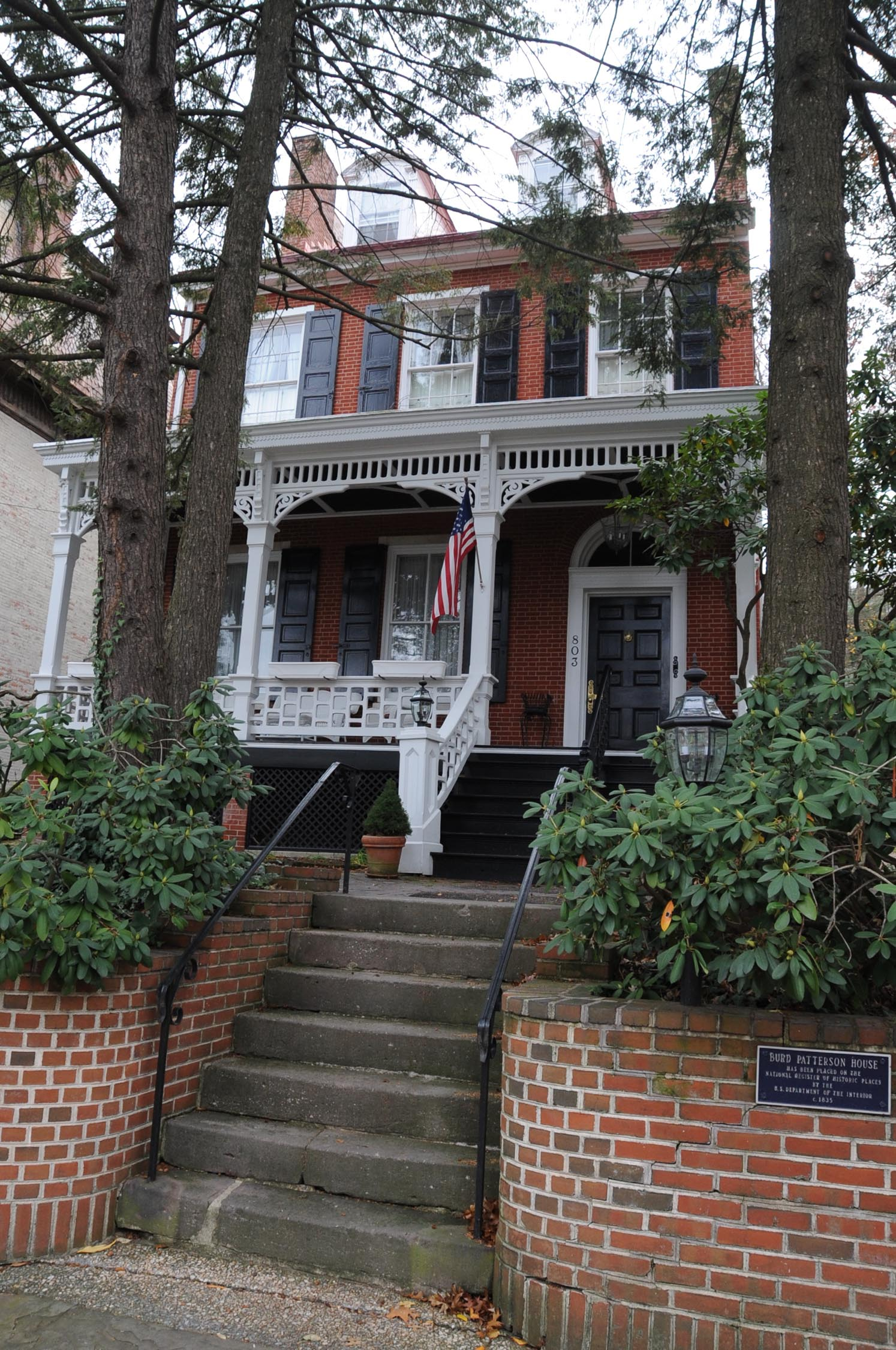
- Burd Patterson House, November 2008

- Location within Pennsylvania Location within the United States
- Location: 803 Mahantongo St., Pottsville, Pennsylvania
- Coordinates: 40°40′53″N 76°12′2″W
- Area: 0.6 acres (0.24 ha)
- Built: c. 1830-1835
- Architectural style: Federal
- NRHP reference No.: 95000515
- Added to NRHP: April 27, 1995

Burd Patterson House is a historic home located at Pottsville, Schuylkill County, Pennsylvania. It was built about 1830, and is a 2 1/2-story, brick mansion in the Federal style. A rear addition was built about 1835, connecting the main house to a formerly separate summer kitchen. The main house measures 27 feet by 40 feet. It features a Queen Anne style porch added before 1900.

It was added to the National Register of Historic Places in 1995.
