= Fighter's Heaven =

Muhammad Ali's training camp

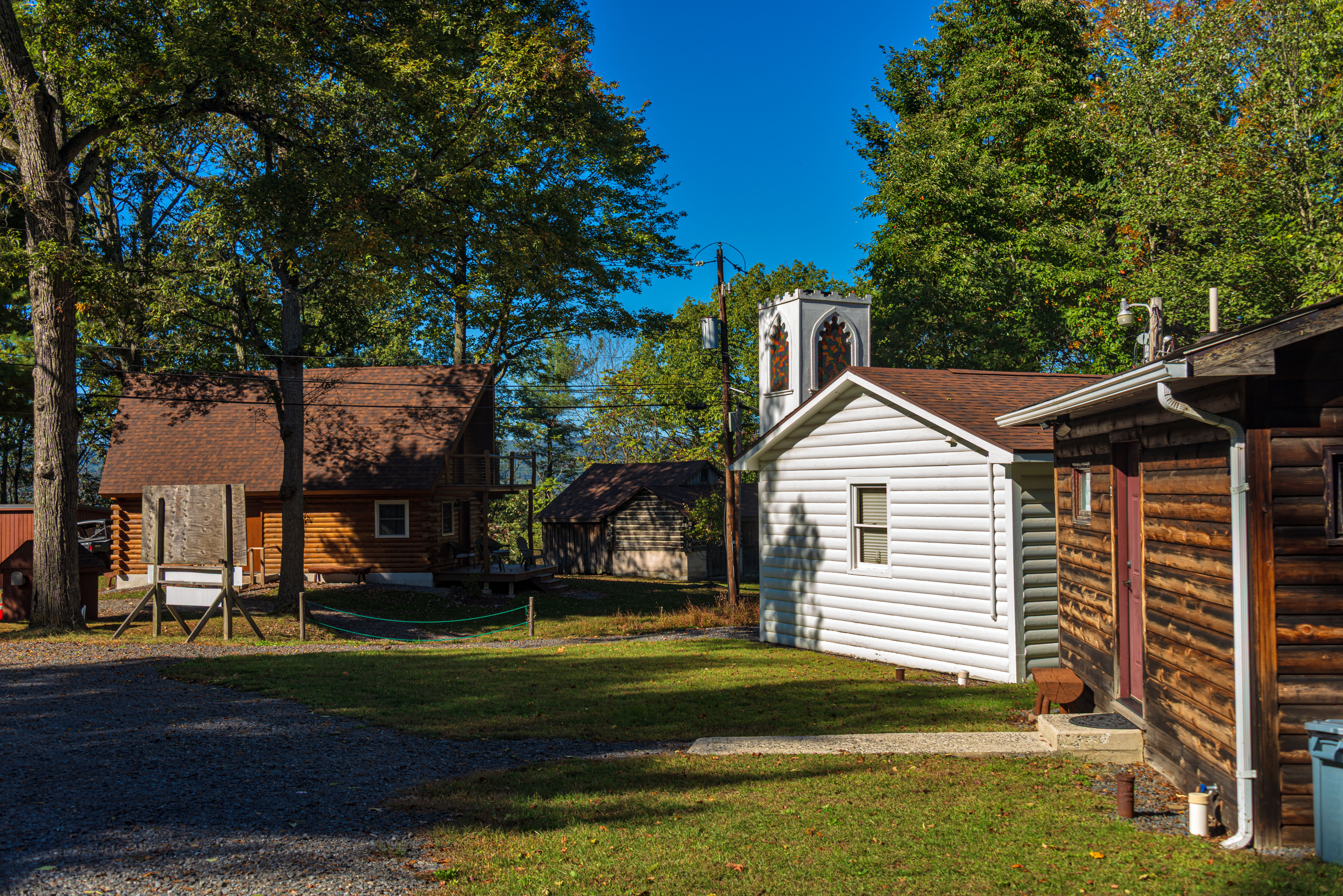
- Mosque, chalet and other buildings, 2025

- Location within Pennsylvania Location within the United States
- Interactive map showing the location of Fighter's Heaven
- Location: Deer Lake, PA
- Nearest city: Pottsville
- Coordinates: 40.6374°N 76.0940°W
- Area: 5–6 acres (2.0–2.4 ha)
- Built: 1972
- NRHP reference No.: SG100009238
- Added to NRHP: August 21, 2023

"Fighter's Heaven" is a compound and training facility in Deer Lake, Pennsylvania, United States, built by former professional boxer and heavyweight champion, Muhammad Ali. Ali trained in the facility preparing for numerous fights, such as Rumble in the Jungle in 1974, and Thrilla in Manila in 1975. Located on a wooded hillside, facilities include a small gym, houses for Ali's family and others, and a mosque.

It was open to the public when Ali was present and training; he would often mix with fans and visitors. In his later years, after he retired from boxing, it was closed. After his 2016 death it was reopened and serves as a museum. In 2023 it was listed on the National Register of Historic Places.

== History ==
=== 1980s-90s ===
After Ali's retirement from the ring, he sold the camp to George Dillman in 1997.

=== Present day ===
Following Ali's death on June 3, 2016, Dillman reopened the compound to the public, including the gym, kitchen, and the cabins. It was then sold to Mike Madden, the son of John Madden, in July 2016.

== Inside the compound ==
After Ali bought the land in 1972, he began to build the cabins by cutting down trees, and getting logs. The compound included a visitors cabin, a gym, a dining hall, a mosque, and his family house. It also included a five stall barn for his horses and donkey. The compound included boulders that showed the painted names of boxing legends, friends, and opponents such as Sonny Liston, Joe Louis, Ali's trainer Angelo Dundee, and Joe Frazier. Elvis Presley would visit the training camp as well.

== See also ==
- National Register of Historic Places listings in Schuylkill County, Pennsylvania
