= Schuylkill County Bridge No. 113 =

Covered bridge in Pennsylvania, US

- U.S. National Register of Historic Places
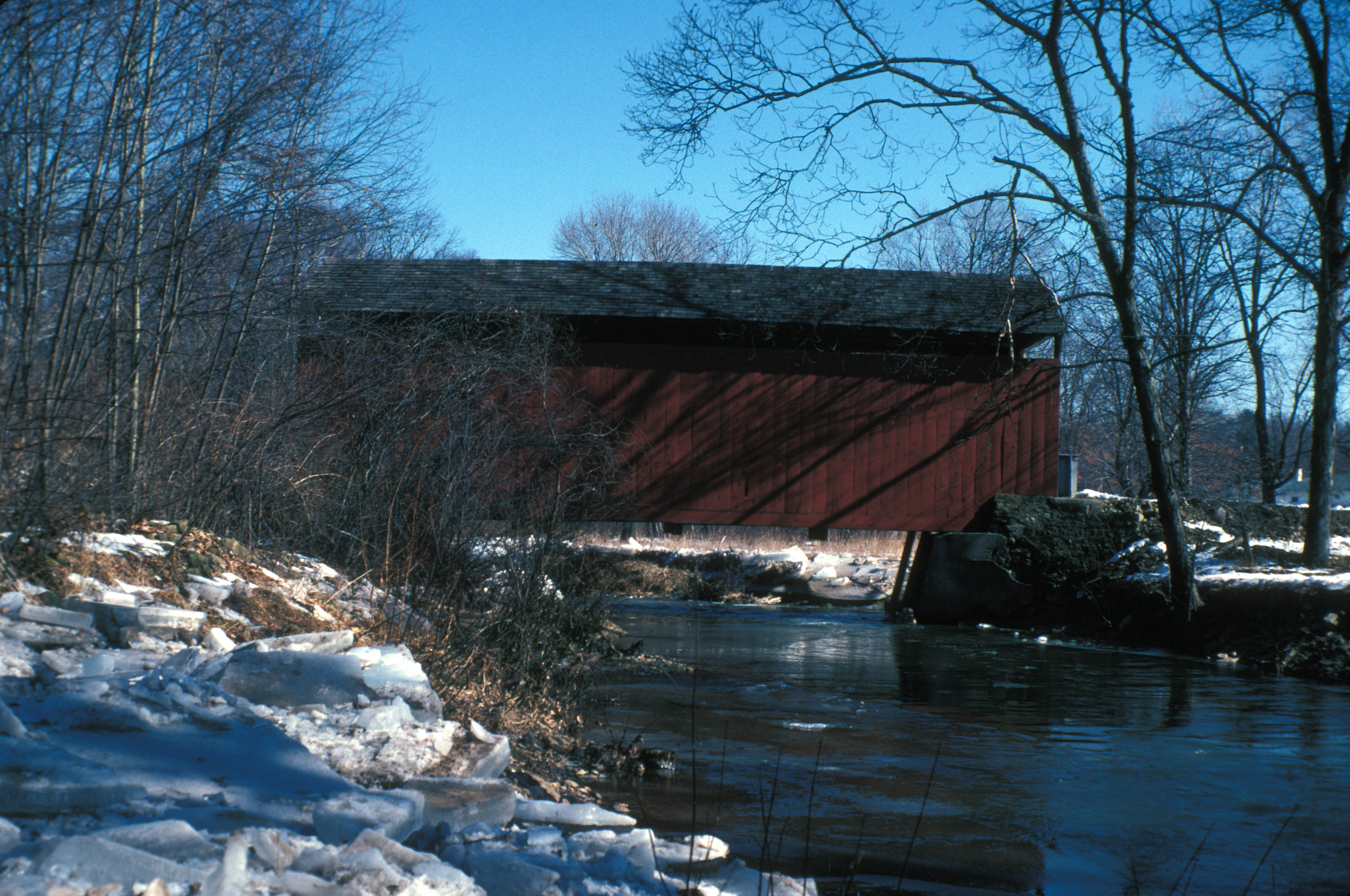

- Location within Pennsylvania Location within the United States
- Location: West of Rock off Pennsylvania Route 895, Washington Township, Pennsylvania
- Coordinates: 40°32′42″N 76°17′43″W
- Area: 0.1 acres (0.040 ha)
- Built: c. 1875
- Architectural style: Burr arch
- NRHP reference No.: 78002468
- Added to NRHP: January 3, 1978

Schuylkill County Bridge No. 113 (also known as Rock Covered Bridge) is a historic wooden covered bridge in Washington Township, Schuylkill County, Pennsylvania. It is a 39-foot-long (12 m), Burr Truss bridge, constructed about 1875. It crosses Little Swatara Creek east of the village of Rock.

It was listed on the National Register of Historic Places in 1978.
