= Deer Lake, Pennsylvania =

Borough in Pennsylvania, US

- Borough
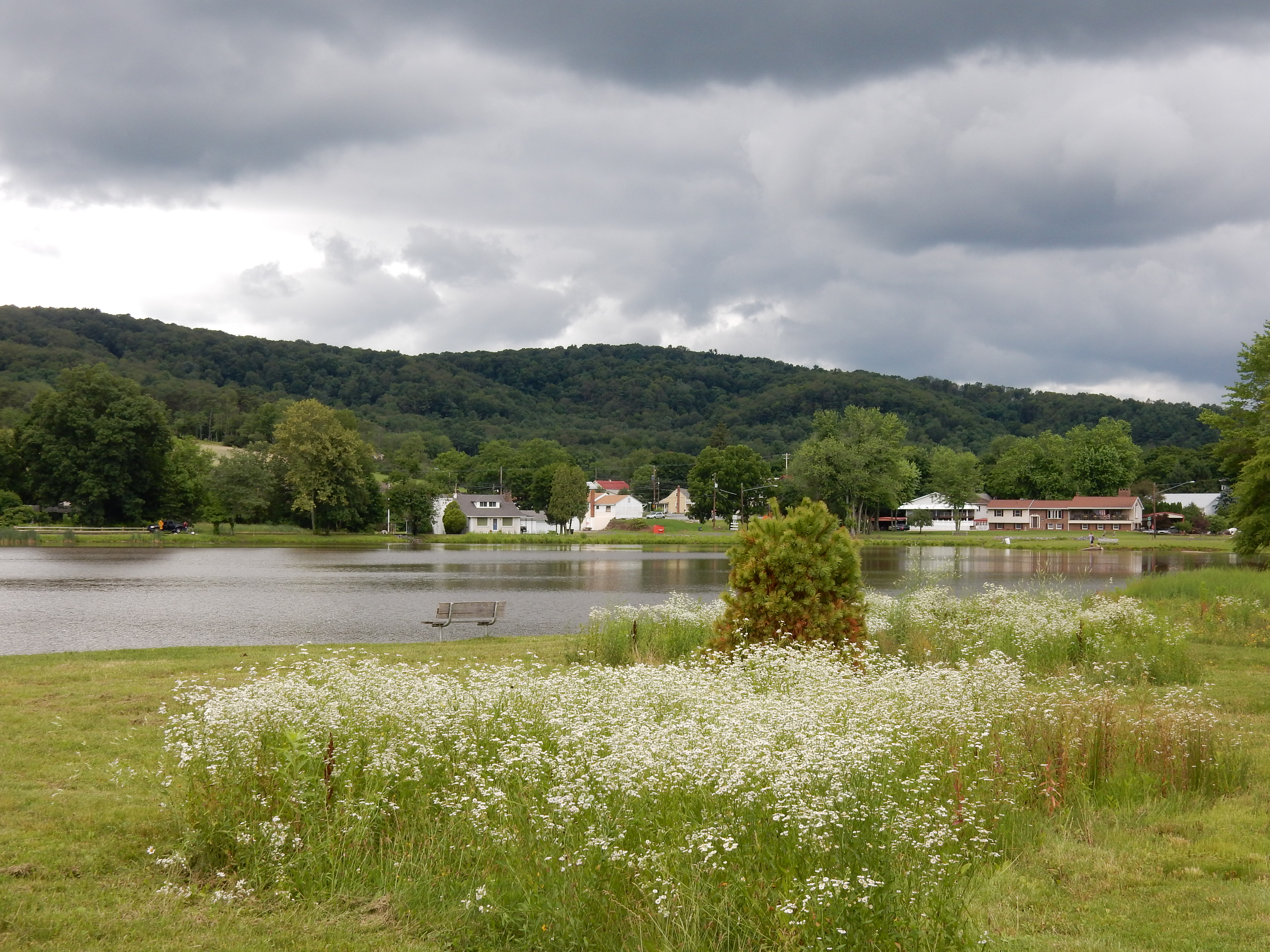
- Deer Lake Pond in June 2015
- Nickname: The Lake
- Location of Deer Lake in Schuylkill County, Pennsylvania

- Location of Deer Park in Pennsylvania Deer Lake (the United States)
- Coordinates: 40°37′19″N 76°03′17″W
- Country: United States
- State: Pennsylvania
- County: Schuylkill
- Incorporated: 1936

Government
  - Type: Borough Council
  - Mayor: Jim Bo

Area
  - Total: 0.47 sq mi (1.22 km^{2})
  - Land: 0.44 sq mi (1.14 km^{2})
  - Water: 0.031 sq mi (0.08 km^{2})
- Elevation: 486 ft (148 m)

Population (2020)
  - Total: 670
  - Density: 1,527.0/sq mi (589.57/km^{2})
- Time zone: UTC-5 (Eastern (EST))
  - Summer (DST): UTC-4 (EDT)
- Zip Code: 17961
- Area code: 570
- FIPS code: 42-18576
- Website: deerlakeboro.com

Deer Lake is a borough in Schuylkill County, Pennsylvania. The population was 670 at the 2020 census. The mayor of the borough is Larry Kozlowski.

== History ==
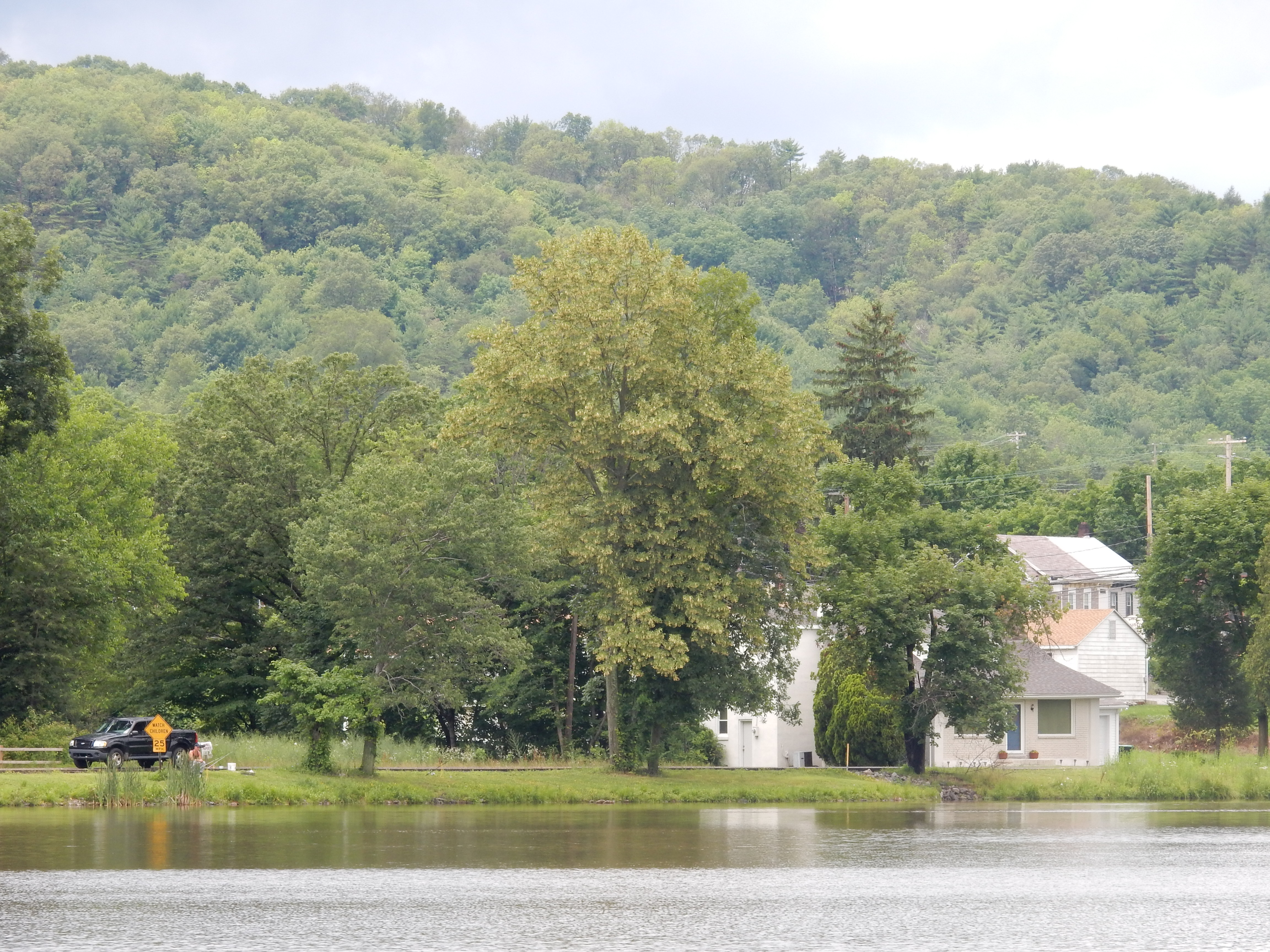
Deer Lake Pond as seen from its eastern coast

The community was founded as a resort community serving coal barons and other members of the wealthy elite of nearby Pottsville. A small summer stock theatre operated during the 1920s, in which actors such as John Kenley performed.

In 1972, Muhammad Ali set his training camp, Fighter's Heaven, in Deer Lake, and it still stands today complete with an indoor boxing ring.

== Geography ==
Deer Lake is located at 40°37′19″N 76°3′17″W (40.621903, -76.054638).

According to the U.S. Census Bureau, the borough has a total area of 0.4 square miles (1.0 km^{2}), of which 0.4 square miles (1.0 km^{2}) is land and 0.04 square miles (0.10 km^{2}) (6.67%) is water.

Pennsylvania Route 61 is the principal highway passing through Deer Lake.

== Demographics ==
Historical population
Census	Pop.	Note	%±
1940	65		—
1950	174		167.7%
1960	334		92.0%
1970	347		3.9%
1980	515		48.4%
1990	550		6.8%
2000	528		−4.0%
2010	687		30.1%
2020	670		−2.5%
2021 (est.)	673	▲	0.4%

As of the census of 2000, there were 528 people, 203 households, and 160 families living in the borough. The population density was 1,261.8 inhabitants per square mile (487.2/km^{2}). There were 216 housing units at an average density of 516.2 units per square mile (199.3 units/km^{2}). The racial makeup of the borough was 98.30% White, 0.19% Native American, 1.33% Asian, and 0.19% from two or more races. Hispanic or Latino of any race were 0.19% of the population.

There were 203 households, out of which 34.0% had children under the age of 18 living with them, 66.5% were married couples living together, 8.9% had a female householder with no husband present, and 20.7% were non-families. 18.2% of all households were made up of individuals, and 6.9% had someone living alone who was 65 years of age or older. The average household size was 2.60 and the average family size was 2.94.

In the borough the population was spread out, with 23.1% under the age of 18, 7.0% from 18 to 24, 30.9% from 25 to 44, 27.7% from 45 to 64, and 11.4% who were 65 years of age or older. The median age was 39 years. For every 100 females there were 89.9 males. For every 100 females age 18 and over, there were 95.2 males.

The median income for a household in the borough was $52,386, and the median income for a family was $61,042. Males had a median income of $36,000 versus $28,611 for females. The per capita income for the borough was $25,577. About 1.3% of families and 4.0% of the population were below the poverty line, including none of those under age 18 and 13.3% of those age 65 or over.

== Gallery ==
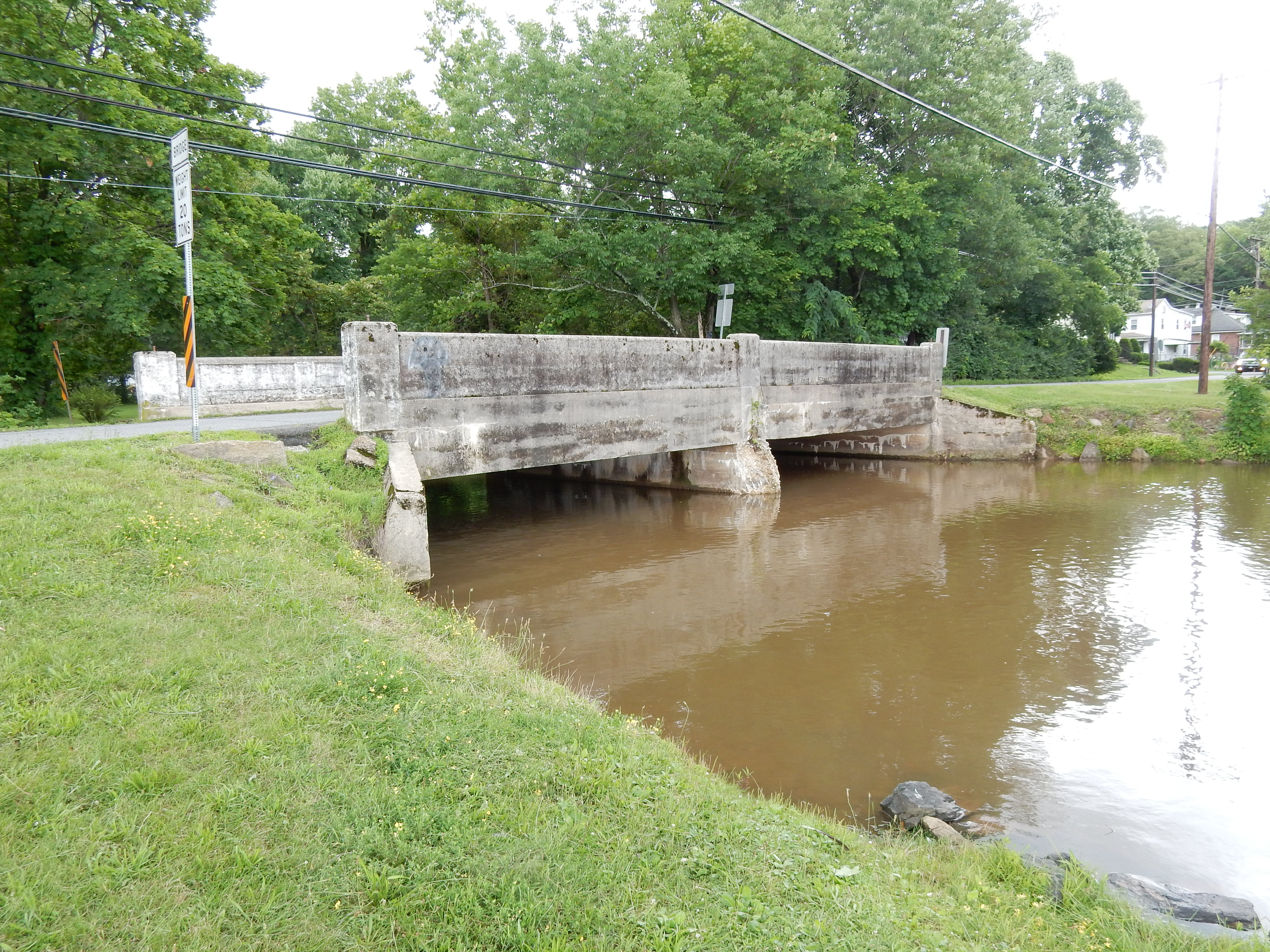
Pine Creek Bridge.

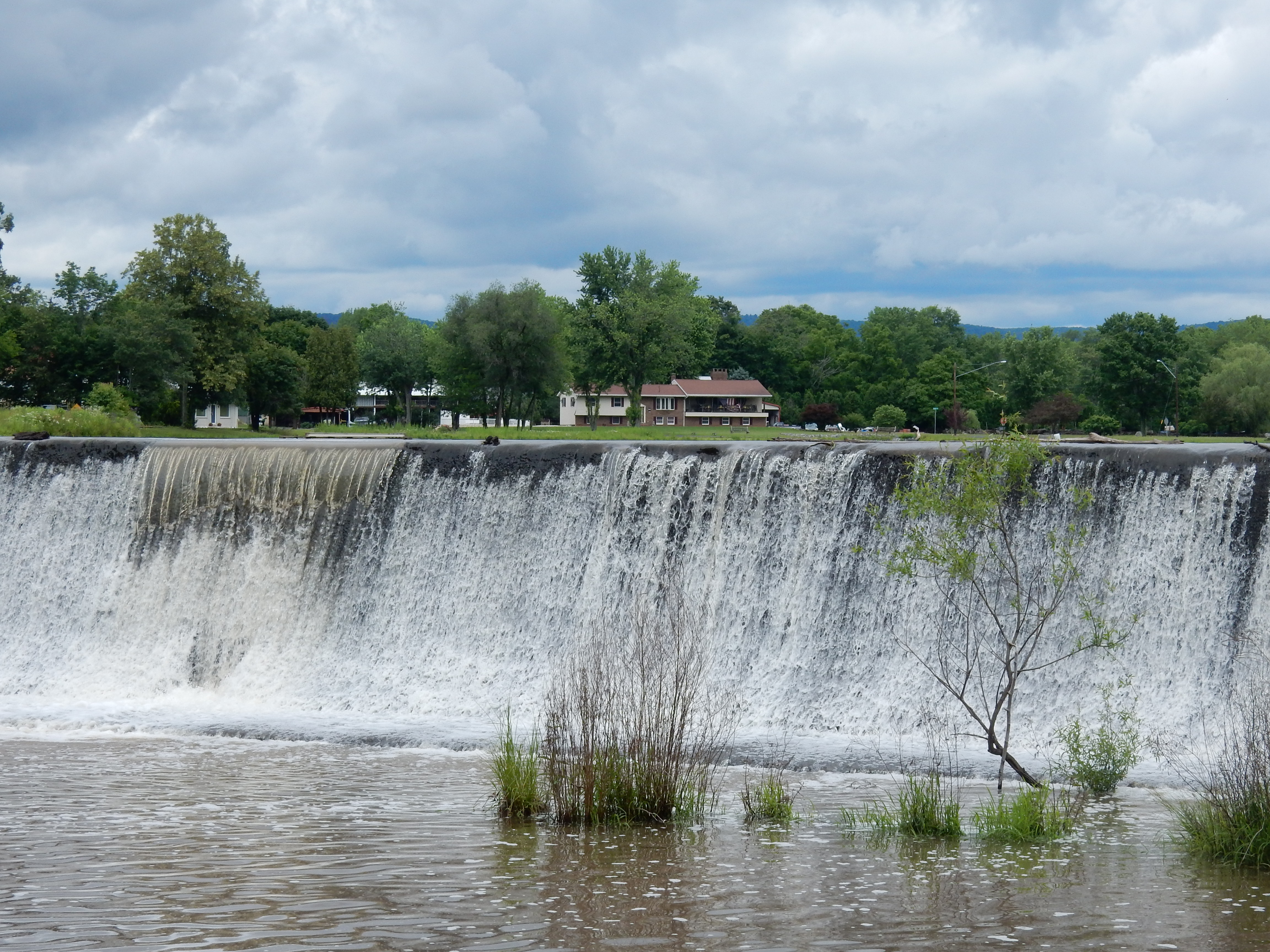
Deer Lake Pond Dam.

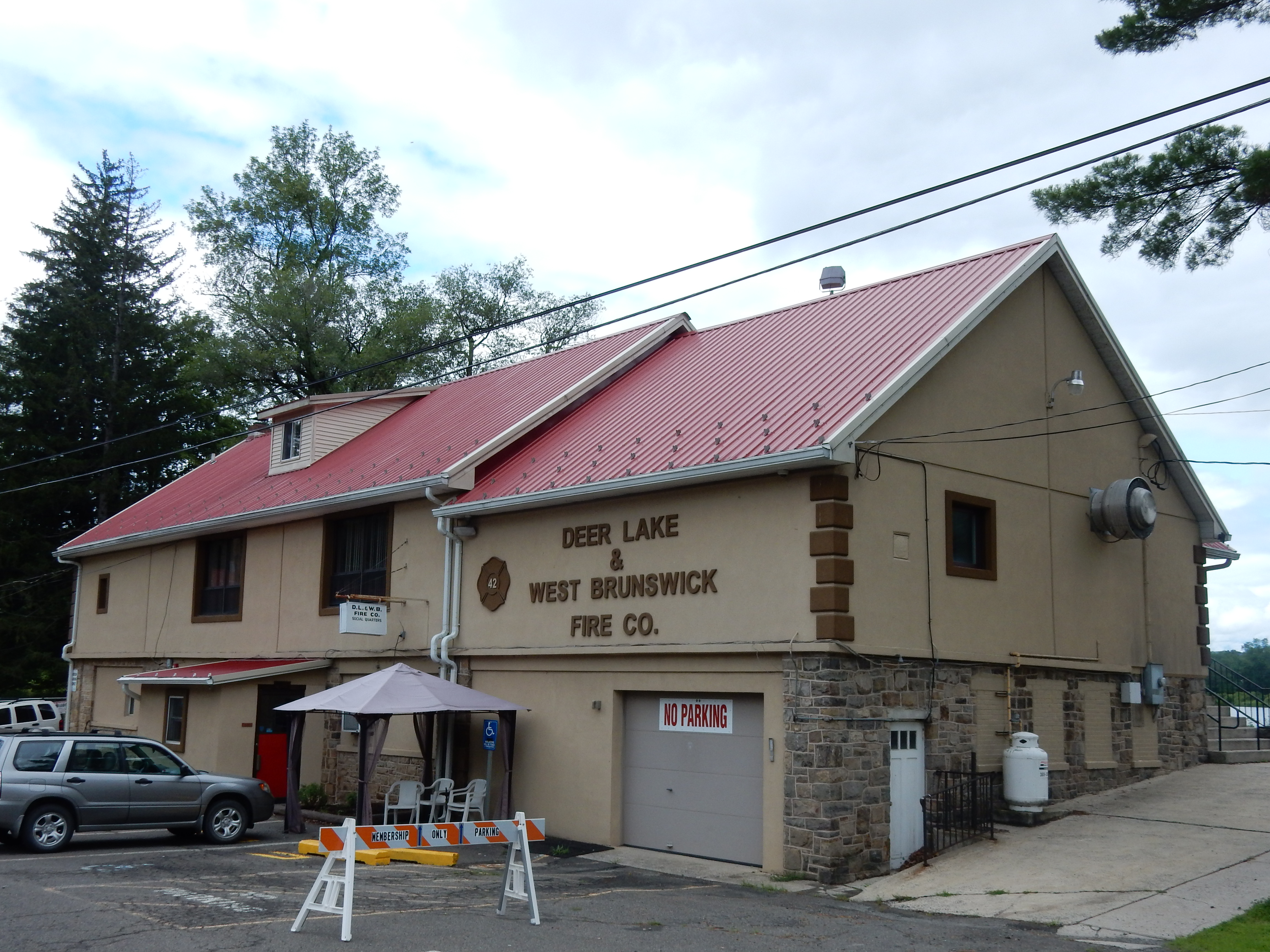
Deer Lake & West Brunswick Fire Co.
