= Pottsville Downtown Historic District =

Historic district in Pennsylvania, United States

- U.S. National Register of Historic Places
- U.S. Historic district
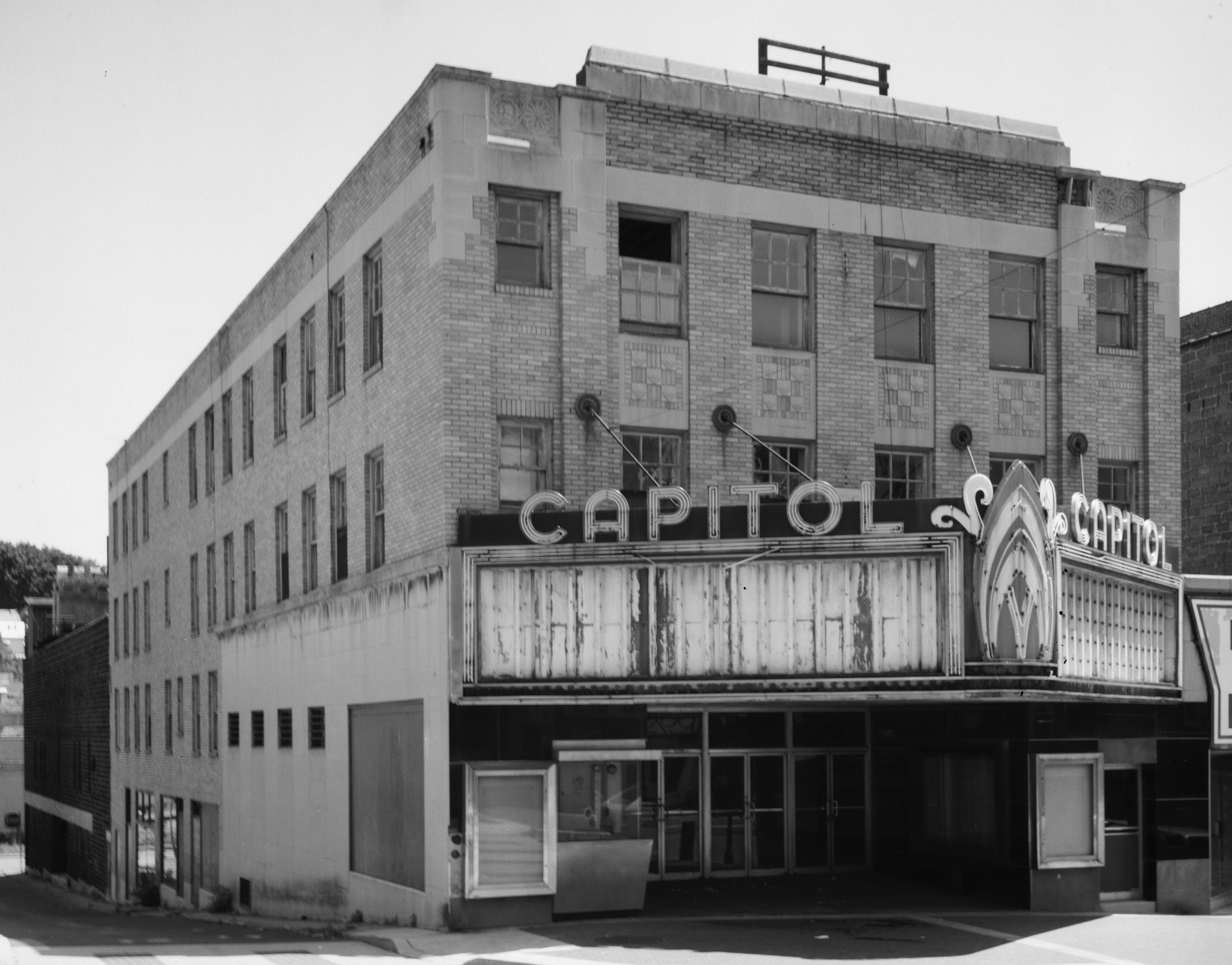
- Capitol Theatre, July 1982

- Location within Pennsylvania Location within the United States
- Location: Roughly bounded by Laurel Blvd., Railroad, Morris and 4th Sts., Pottsville, Pennsylvania
- Coordinates: 40°40′59″N 76°11′41″W
- Area: 40 acres (16 ha)
- Architect: Frank X. Reilly
- Architectural style: Late 19th And 20th Century Revivals, Mid 19th Century Revival, Late Victorian
- NRHP reference No.: 82003819
- Added to NRHP: March 1, 1982

The Pottsville Downtown Historic District is a national historic district located in Pottsville, Schuylkill County, Pennsylvania. Bordered roughly by Laurel Boulevard and Railroad, Morris and 4th streets, it encompasses 336 contributing buildings in the central business district and surrounding residential areas of the city of Pottsville.

It was added to the National Register of Historic Places in 1982.

== History ==
Preservation consultant Thomas E. Jones prepared the nomination form for this historic district's proposed placement on the National Register of Historic Places. Prior to Jones' involvement, the importance of historic structures and properties in this section of Pottsville were documented in the Historic Pottsville Survey, which was conducted between October 1979 and April 1980. According to Jones, the records of this prior survey were maintained by the Schuylkill County Council for the Arts at the time of his NRHP application preparation. This district was subsequently added to the National Register of Historic Places in 1982.

== Notable buildings ==
The Pottsville Downtown Historic District encompasses 336 contributing buildings in the city of Pottsville's central business district, as well as surrounding residential areas of the city, which were built in mid-19th Century Revival, late 19th and 20th Century Revival, and late Victorian architectural styles. Among the structures included in this district are the:

- Reading Freight Station: built circa 1851
- Sovereign Majestic Theater: a 224-seat theater located on North Centre Street, which is a contributing structure within the Pottsville Downtown Historic District, according to the National Registers of Historic Places
