= Pottsville Armory =

- U.S. National Register of Historic Places
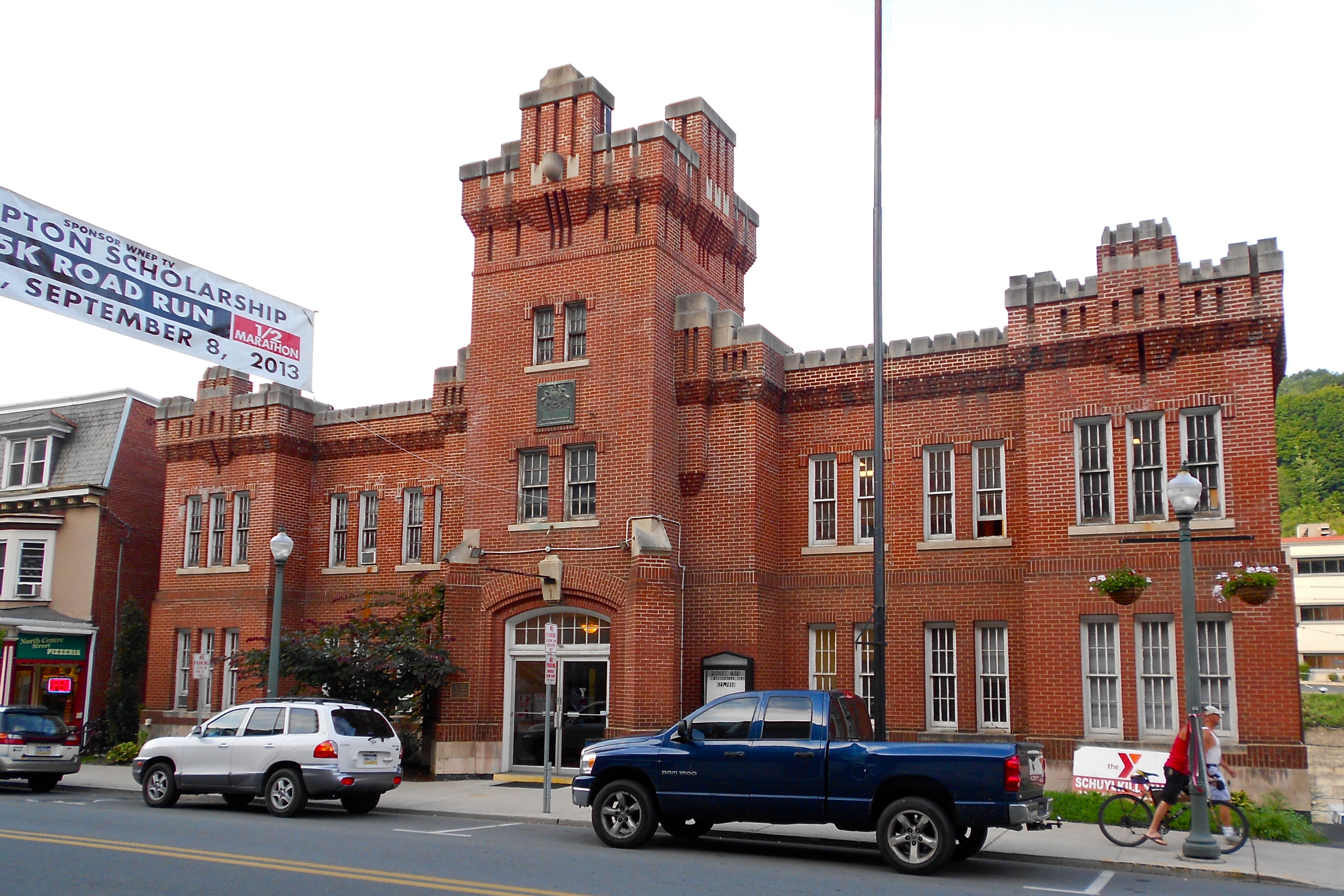
- Pottsville Armory in August 2013

- Location within Pennsylvania Location within the United States
- Location: 520 N. Centre St., Pottsville, Pennsylvania
- Coordinates: 40°41′28″N 76°11′54″W
- Area: 0.3 acres (0.12 ha)
- Built: 1913
- Architect: McCormick & French; Wertley, Walter & Sons
- Architectural style: Romanesque, Late Gothic Revival
- MPS: Pennsylvania National Guard Armories MPS
- NRHP reference No.: 91001701
- Added to NRHP: November 14, 1991

The Pottsville Armory is an historic National Guard armory in Pottsville, Schuylkill County, Pennsylvania, United States.

It was added to the National Register of Historic Places in 1991.

== History and architectural features ==
Built in 1913, this historic structure is a brick, "T"-plan building that consists of a two-story administration building with a one-and-one-half-story, rear drill hall with an arched roof. It was designed in a combined Romanesque Revival/Late Gothic Revival style. The front elevation features a three-story central tower.

The building is currently used as home to the Schuylkill YMCA. schuylkillymca.org
