= Schuylkill County Bridge No. 114 =

- U.S. National Register of Historic Places
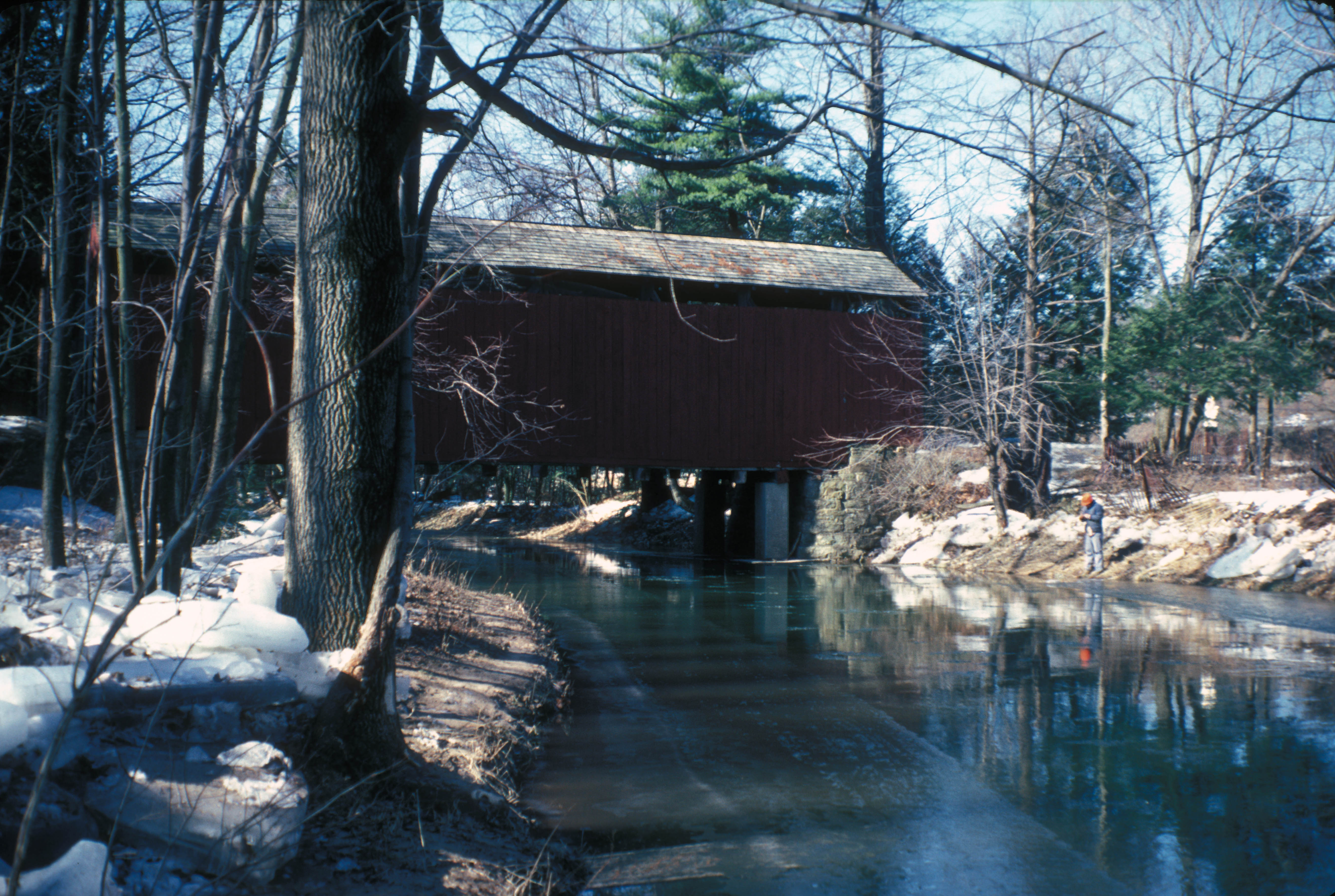

- Location within Pennsylvania Location within the United States
- Location: East of Rock off Pennsylvania Route 895, Washington Township, Pennsylvania
- Coordinates: 40°32′39″N 76°19′33″W
- Area: 0.1 acres (0.040 ha)
- Built: c. 1875
- Architectural style: Burr arch
- NRHP reference No.: 78002467
- Added to NRHP: January 3, 1978

Schuylkill County Bridge No. 114 (also known as Zimmerman's Covered Bridge) is a historic wooden covered bridge in Washington Township, Schuylkill County, Pennsylvania. It is a 50.6-foot-long (15.4 m), Burr Truss bridge, constructed about 1875. It crosses Little Swatara Creek west of the village of Rock.

It was listed on the National Register of Historic Places in 1978. In 2023, a rehabilitation was completed to replace some of the trusses, sidings and roof.
