= Megargee =

Megargee is a surname. Notable people with the surname include:

- Edwin Megargee (1883–1958), American painter, illustrator, and author
- Geoffrey P. Megargee (1959–2020), American historian
- Lon Megargee (1883–1960), American painter, cousin of Edwin
