= Hermosa Inn =

Coordinates: 33.5185°N 112.0048°W

- The Hermosa Inn
- Interactive map of the Hermosa Inn area

General information
- Location: 5532 N Palo Cristi Rd., Paradise Valley, Arizona, USA, 85253
- Opening: 1936
- Owner: Ron D. Allred

Other information
- Number of rooms: 43 casitas

Website
- hermosainn.com

The Hermosa Inn is a small boutique hotel located in the Phoenix suburb of Paradise Valley near 32nd Street and Camelback Road.

== History ==
Lon's at the Hermosa

Cowboy artist Alonzo "Lon" Megargee purchased 6 acres (24,000 m^{2}) of land in what is now considered Paradise Valley in 1935. He built his studio of adobe bricks in the middle of the site and kept adding to it, calling his home Los Arcos and later Casa Hermosa, meaning "beautiful house."

Megargee had no formal plans for the building. Influenced by architecture he had studied in Spain and Mexico, he used old wooden beams from an abandoned mine and poured a mixture of oil and ash from the roof to age the exterior walls. Due to the extended length of the stays of many of his guests, Megargee began running a guest ranch to supplement his artist's income. Local law enforcement suspected that Megargee used the ranch for illegal gambling, so he constructed a tunnel from the main building to the stables to provide an easy escape into the desert should the law make a surprise visit.

The Hermosa Inn is allegedly haunted by the ghost of its original owner, Alonzo Megargee. Guests and hotel staff have reported seeing the lanky cowboy in the inn. He is also believed to be the culprit behind toilets flushing on their own, he’s also known to break glasses and bottles late at night. Staff have reported encountering the ghost of “Lon”, appearing as a shadow wearing a cowboy hat.

Succeeding owners renamed the property Hermosa Inn, and added a pool, tennis courts, casitas, and villas. In 1987, a fire severely damaged the original building.

The property was purchased by Fred and Jennifer Unger in 1992. Following restoration of the adobe walls, charred beams, and ironwork in the main building, the property re-opened in 1994, again as the Hermosa Inn, with a restaurant - "Lon's at the Hermosa", named for Lon Megargee - occupying the original building. In 1995 the Hermosa Inn was featured in Waiting to Exhale. Whitney Houston's character celebrates New Year's Eve in Lon's main dining room.

In May 2015, the Ungers sold the resort to Allred Capital LLLP, a partnership led by Ron Allred and Mike Allred. While still retaining the historic charm of the original hacienda built by the cowboy artist as his home and studio, the Allreds have improved upon the overall guest experience for future generations by adding a new entryway, resort lobby, a renovation to the historic rancho casitas, an expansion to LON’s Last Drop and the addition of multiple casitas, bringing it to its current total of 43 accommodations.
