= Arizona State Capitol =

Capitol building of the U.S. state of Arizona

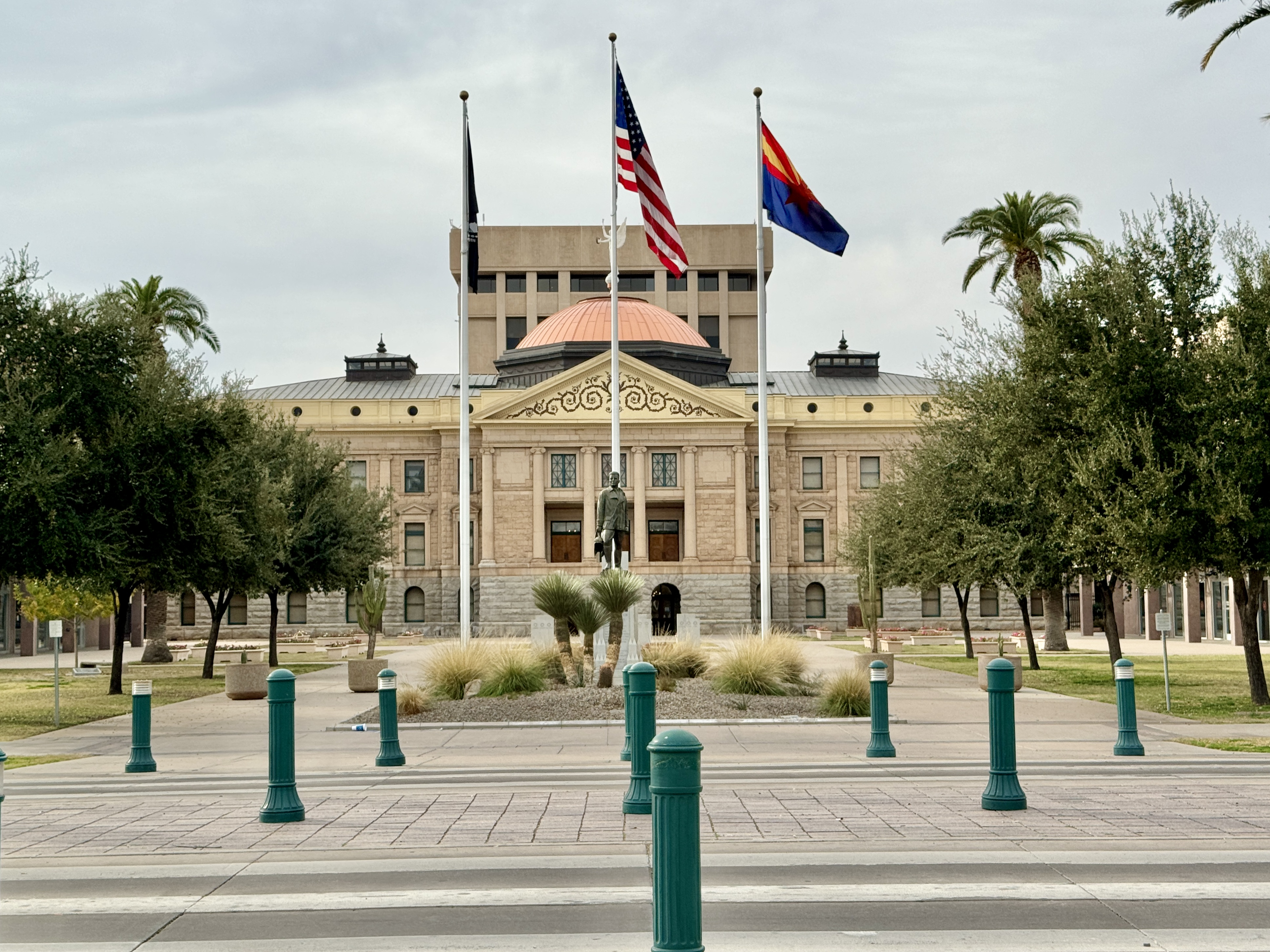
- The Arizona State Capitol from South 17th Street

General information
- Architectural style: Neoclassical, Beaux-Arts
- Location: 1700 West Washington Street; Phoenix, Arizona; United States
- Coordinates: 33°26′53″N 112°5′47″W
- Inaugurated: February 24, 1901
- Client: State of Arizona
- Owner: State of Arizona

Design and construction
- Architect: James Riely Gordon
- Main contractor: Tom Lovell

U.S. National Register of Historic Places
- Official name: Arizona State Capitol Building
- Designated: October 29, 1974
- Reference no.: 74000455

The Arizona State Capitol is the seat of government for the U.S. state of Arizona and is located in its capital city of Phoenix. The capitol comprises the original State Capitol building; two buildings housing the legislative chambers for the Arizona State Legislature made up of the House of Representatives and the Senate; and Executive Tower containing offices for the Governor. It was originally built in 1900 as the capitol for the Arizona Territory, and became the state capitol after Arizona was admitted into the Union in 1912. The 1900 capitol is maintained as the Arizona Capitol Museum with a focus on the history and culture of Arizona.

== History ==
=== Earlier capitols ===
On February 24, 1863, the Arizona Territory was created by splitting the existing New Mexico Territory along a north–south line. Initially, the bill specified the capital was to be located in Tucson, but that stipulation was removed before the final passage of the bill. The first session of the new Territorial Legislature convened in Prescott on September 26, 1864 in a "long, one-story log-house" built for the legislature. The building was roughly built, and due to its inadequate chinking, notably drafty and uncomfortable in the winter. The second legislative session was held at nearby saloon, while the third was held in an "old courthouse and jail". The legislature voted on September 27, 1867 to the relocate the capital "permanently" to Tucson by November 1. The move was considered controversial and was subject to allegations of fraud on the part of Governor Richard McCormick. While in Tucson, the legislature met in a series of existing adobe buildings.

In January 1877, it was voted to move the capital back to Prescott at the start of the next session in January 1879 where the legislature then resided in "large, frame building" known as Curtis Hall. Due to its remoteness, its harsh winters and lack of direct railroad connections, by the next legislative session in 1881, members were already debating the suitability of Prescott as the Arizona capital and if it should be moved back to Tucson or elsewhere. By 1889, the legislature came to a decision and voted to relocate to Phoenix on January 29. It immediately adjourned in Prescott to reconvene a week later on February 6 at the city hall in Phoenix.

=== Territorial capitol ===
As part of an effort to demonstrate that the Arizona Territory was ready for statehood, a bond issue for $100,000 was approved for the construction of a territorial capitol. An additional $25,000 for the construction was authorized in 1899. James Riely Gordon was chosen to design the new capitol building by winning a design contest. His original plan called for the capitol to be much larger, with a more prominent rotunda and large wings for both houses of the legislature on each side of the current building. Funding deficits meant the project had to be reduced, so the legislative wings were discarded from the plan and a small lead-alloy top substituted for Gordon's decorative dome.

Construction of the Capitol began when ground was broken in March 1899 with the work undertaken by the contractor Tom Lovell of Denton, Texas. Unusually, a cornerstone was not used in the construction of the capitol as when the site was prepared for one, and when a ceremony would have been held, it was during the hot, desert summer when outdoor activity was minimized. The completed capitol building was turned over to the territorial government on May 1, 1900. The legislature began meeting in the new capitol on January 21, 1901 at the start of the legislative session, and it was publicly dedicated in ceremony of February 24.

=== State capitol ===
In 1918 and 1938, expansions were added on the west side of the building, which had the same architecture and increased the total square footage from the original 40,000 to a final 123,000. It was home to the Legislature until 1960, when the current house and senate buildings were constructed, and the Governor's Office until 1974, when the executive tower was built. The state at that time had a plan of converting the original Capitol into a museum dedicated to Arizona's history. The original opening of the Arizona Capitol Museum was announced by Governor Bruce Babbitt at his inauguration in 1978 and hosted over 40,000 schoolchildren in that first year in 1979. After a restoration, the building was re-opened as a museum in 1981. In the 1990s, more than $3 million was spent to renovate the Capitol and rooms were restored to their original design. Again, due to budget deficits, construction was stopped on a few rooms on the third floor and they remain incomplete. The 1900 Capitol was listed on the National Register of Historic Places on October 29, 1974.

After the Great Recession created a $3.2 billion deficit in a state's budget, the Arizona government put up for sale a number of buildings and state prisons, as well as the Capitol. The sale, which included both legislature buildings and Executive Tower, closed on January 13 and resulted in $735 million in revenue for the government who would then leaseback the properties. It was estimated that the arrangement would cost Arizona $1.5 billion in lease payments over the 20-year lease. The original capitol building was not a part of the transaction. During the 2019 State of the State address, Governor Doug Ducey announced that as part of a refinancing, the state would regain ownership of the Capitol buildings sold in 2010. Under terms of the initial sale, the earliest refinancing could occur was in July 2020.

On the night of June 24, 2022, and into the morning of June 25, police and pro-choice activists clashed outside the building in protest of the Supreme Court ruling in Dobbs v. Jackson Women's Health Organization. The protesters numbered over 5,000 persons. The Arizona Department of Public Safety deployed tear gas and flash bang grenades against the protesters, forcing them to disperse. Arizona Senate Republicans accused the protestors of attempting to storm the building, with GOP State Senator Kelly Townsend tweeting that the legislators were "being held hostage" and comparing the protest to the 2021 United States Capitol attack. She also called for a "J24 Committee" in reference to the January 6 committee.

== Arizona Capitol Museum ==
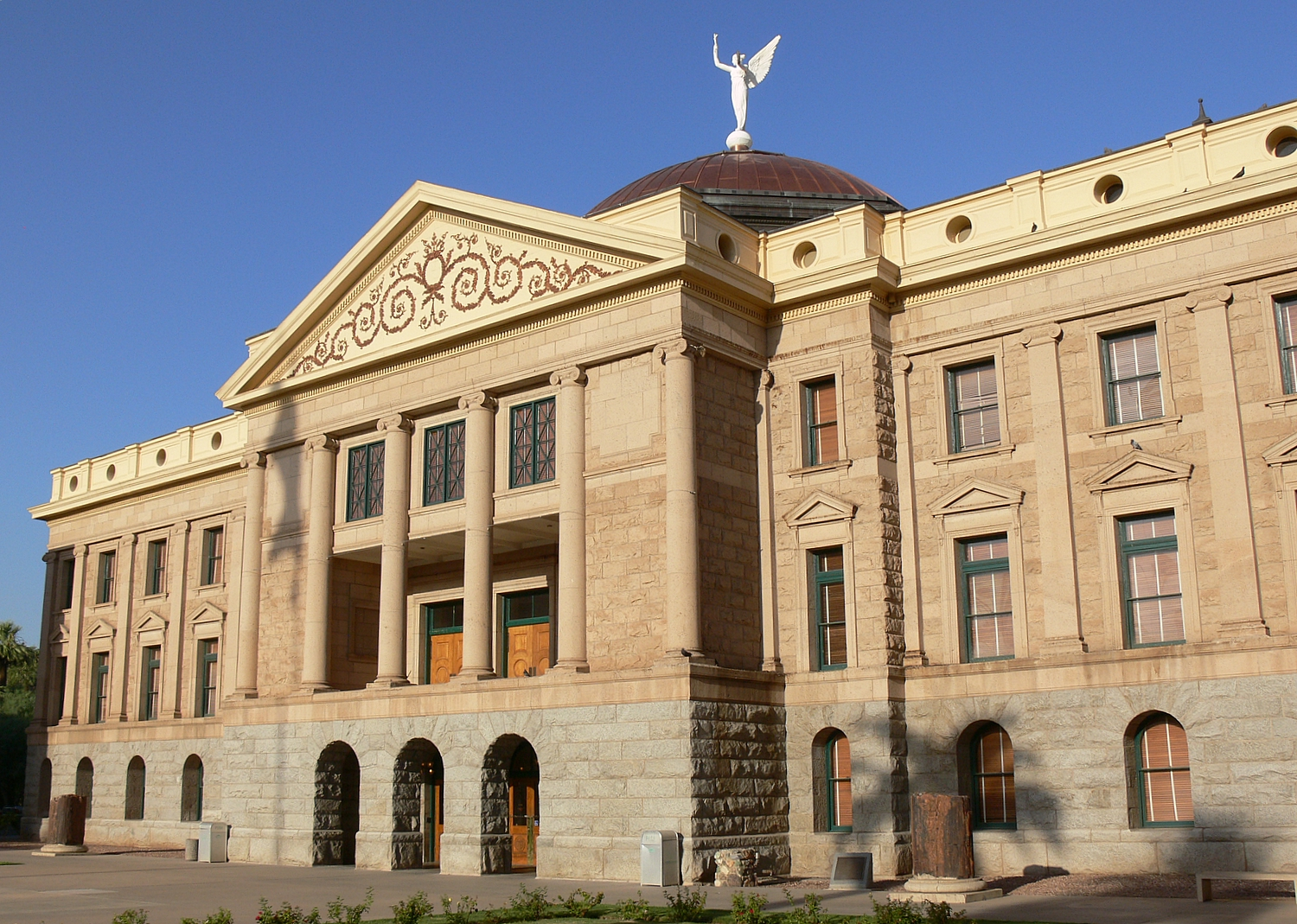
View of the original capitol building

Museum exhibits, events, and programs focus on the evolution of Arizona from Territory to State. The Arizona Takes Shape exhibit provides school-age visitors curriculum-related information for Arizona State History and government studies. The museum has over 20 exhibits featuring contemporary, historical and artifacts from the Arizona state-owned collections. Permanent exhibits include the sinking of USS Arizona, the formal silver service from USS Arizona, a timeline of events pivotal in making Arizona a state, the Governor and Secretary of State's original offices, the historical senate, and house.

Visitors can enter the Historic House Chamber where the people can sit at the desks. There is also a room dedicated to the 140 changes in the Arizona Constitution over 100 years of statehood. The Governor's office on the second floor includes artifacts from several of Arizona's governors as well as a flag used by Teddy Roosevelt's Rough Riders.

One impressive display shows the enormous silver and copper punchbowl service from USS Arizona, as well as a bronze sculpture that was ensconced outside the Admiral's stateroom and used as a centerpiece at state dinners wherever USS Arizona was docked. Both of these historical artifacts survived the sinking of Arizona because they had been removed from the ship for cleaning prior to the attack on Pearl Harbor. The punchbowl service is the only one of its kind and is composed of etched copper panels depicting desert scenes set into a silver bowl ornamented with mermaids, dolphins, waves, and other nautical themes.

Of particular interest is the display of a collection of gifts received by Arizona as part of the Merci Train sent by France to the United States following World War II. The French wanted to thank America for sending the Friendship Train: 250 railroad cars full of fuel, oil, and food in 1948 during a time that the European countries were devastated by World War II. Tens of thousands of French citizens donated objects to be sent to the United States and it was decided that because the outpouring of goods was so great, one boxcar would be sent to each state with one being shared between the District of Columbia and the Territory of Hawaii. All of the items were to be loaded in "Forty and Eight"-type boxcars, named after the sign painted on them which stated that 40 men or 8 horses could be loaded inside. Each car was to be adorned with the coats of arms of all of the provinces of France. The capitol building displays work by the noted Arizona artist Lon Megargee. The train car can be found at the McCormick-Stillman Railroad Park in Scottsdale.

== Architecture ==
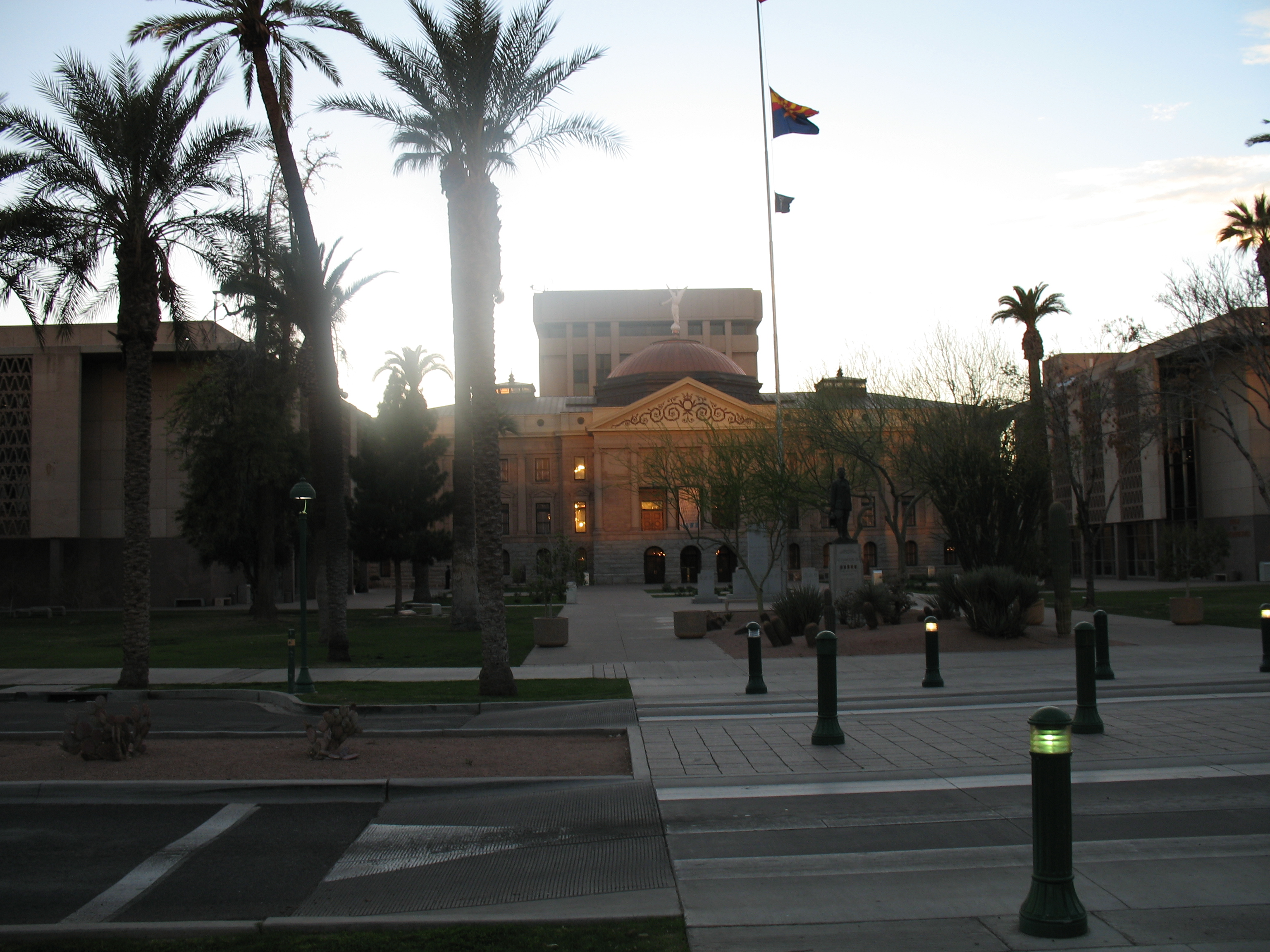
View from the east at sunset. (2007). The Senate building is on the left and the House building is on the right.

The building is made largely from materials indigenous to Arizona, including tufa stone, malapai, granite, and the copper of the dome. The design is optimized for the desert climate of Arizona, with thick masonry walls that insulate the interior, skylights, and round "bullseye" clerestory windows to let heat out of the legislative chambers. The building is topped with a weather vane similar to the Winged Victory of Samothrace, visible through a skylight from within the rotunda.

== Capitol Mall renovation proposal ==
As Arizona's population has grown, the Capitol complex itself has become increasingly crowded. The Senate and House buildings, opened in 1960, have been deteriorating. The Senate, in particular, is prone to constant plumbing problems, and occasionally a broken pipe floods the entire building. The Capitol itself is now used exclusively as a museum, and serves over 70,000 visitors each year, including more than 50,000 school children. In the past complaints had been made that the site was not pleasing aesthetically, and compare the Senate and House buildings as oversized "bunkers" which eclipse the beauty of the Capitol. A task force appointed by the state legislature in 2007 reported that the complex is "barely" adequate to suit the state's current needs and "wholly" inadequate to suit the state's future needs. As a result, proposals were made in 2008 to renovate or rebuild the Capitol site, to a grander site, as well as a site that will serve the needs of the government more adequately. To date, keeping the integrity of the 1901 building in original condition, including the "cramped" spaces occupied by some of the Senate and the House staff have been the main focus for the Capitol Museum administrator and staff. The building's original usage is part of the state history.

Proposals for relocating some office and meeting space back into the Capitol included the House and Senate buildings undergo either a drastic rebuilding and expansion or a complete demolition and construction of new facilities for the House and Senate. A past Arizona State University study planned a comprehensive redesign for the entire Capitol mall and complex.

== Gallery ==
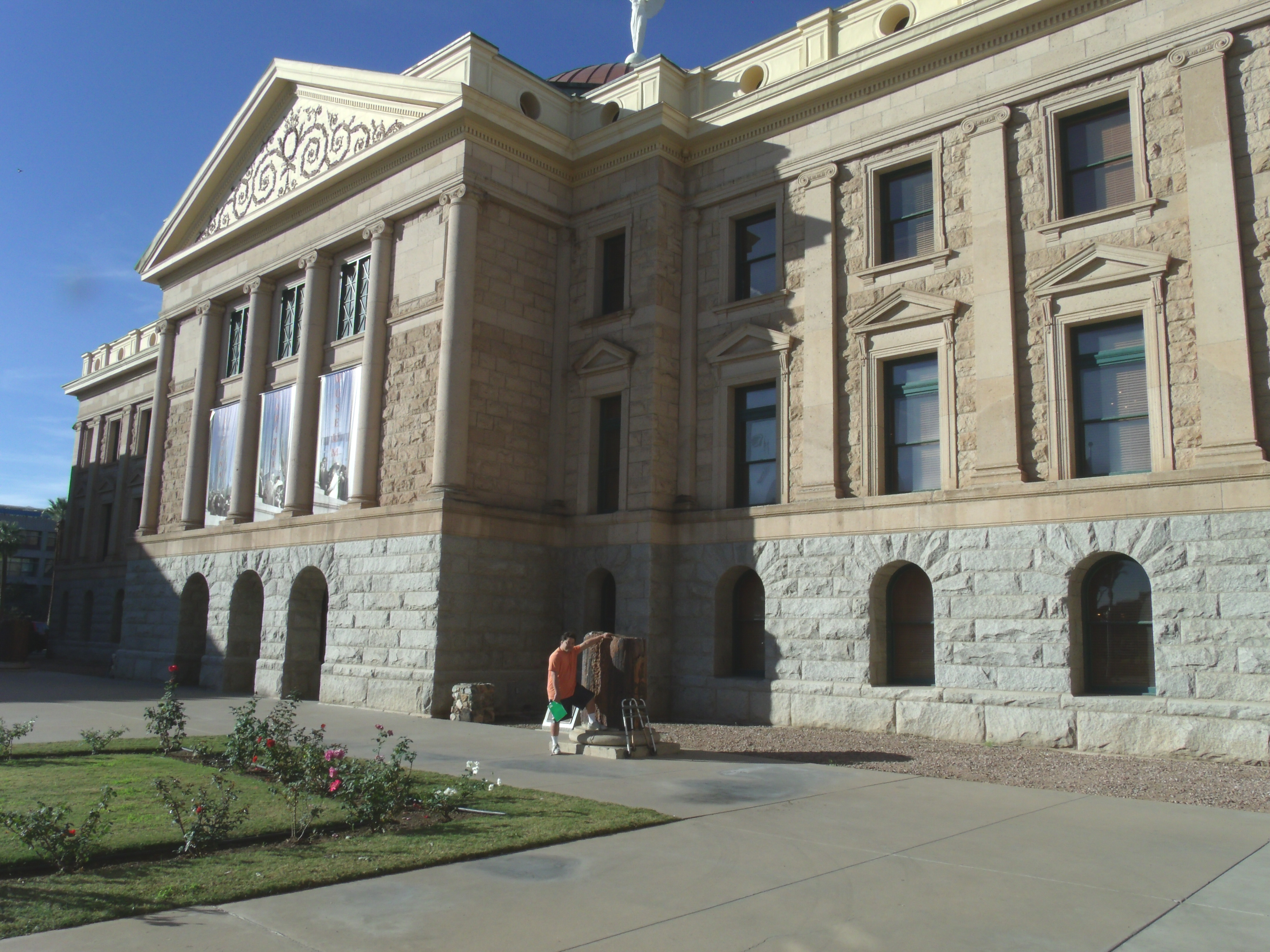
Another view of the Arizona State Capitol, built in 1901, which is now the Arizona State Capitol Museum.

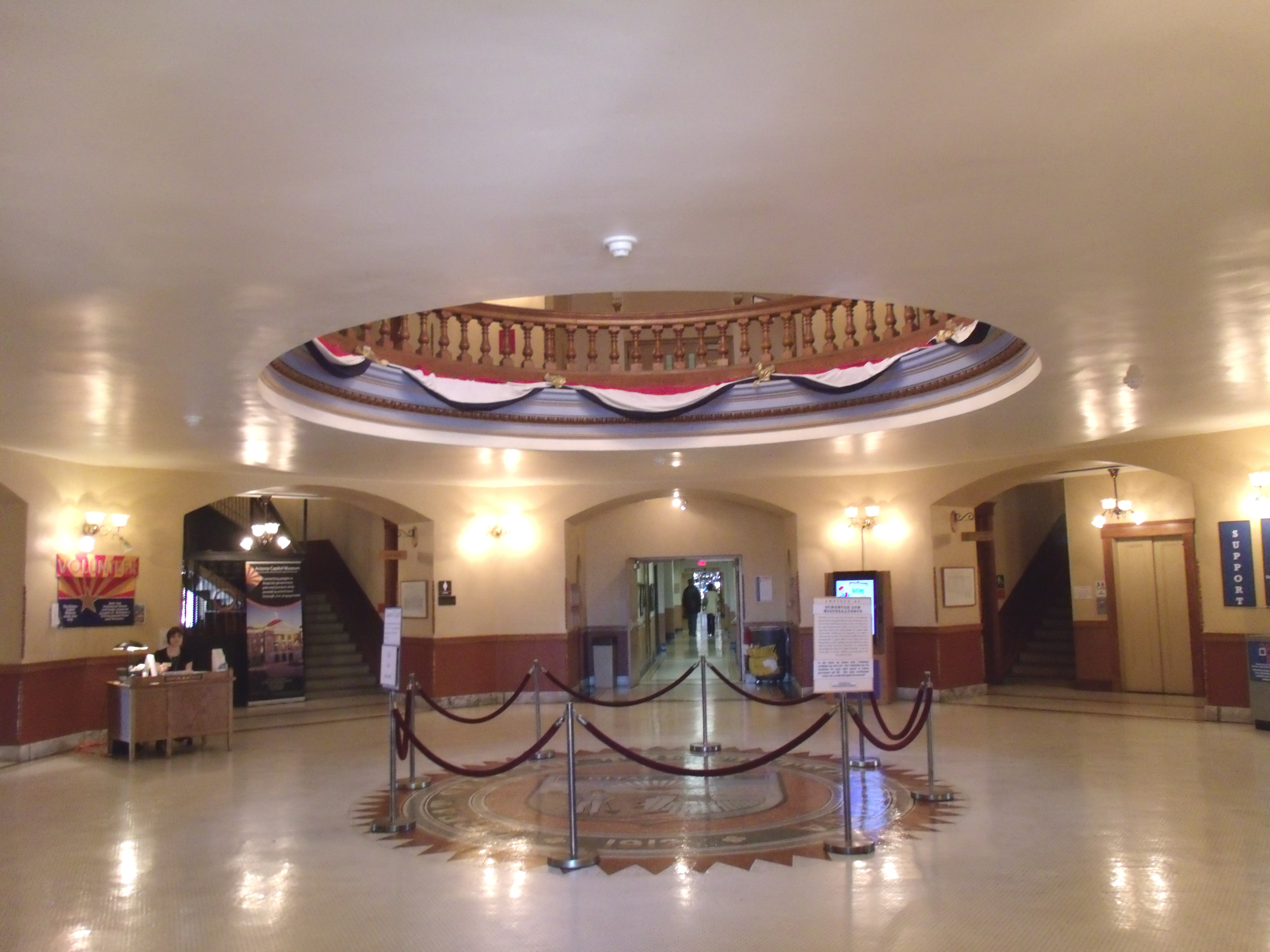
The rotunda floor of the Arizona State Capitol Building.

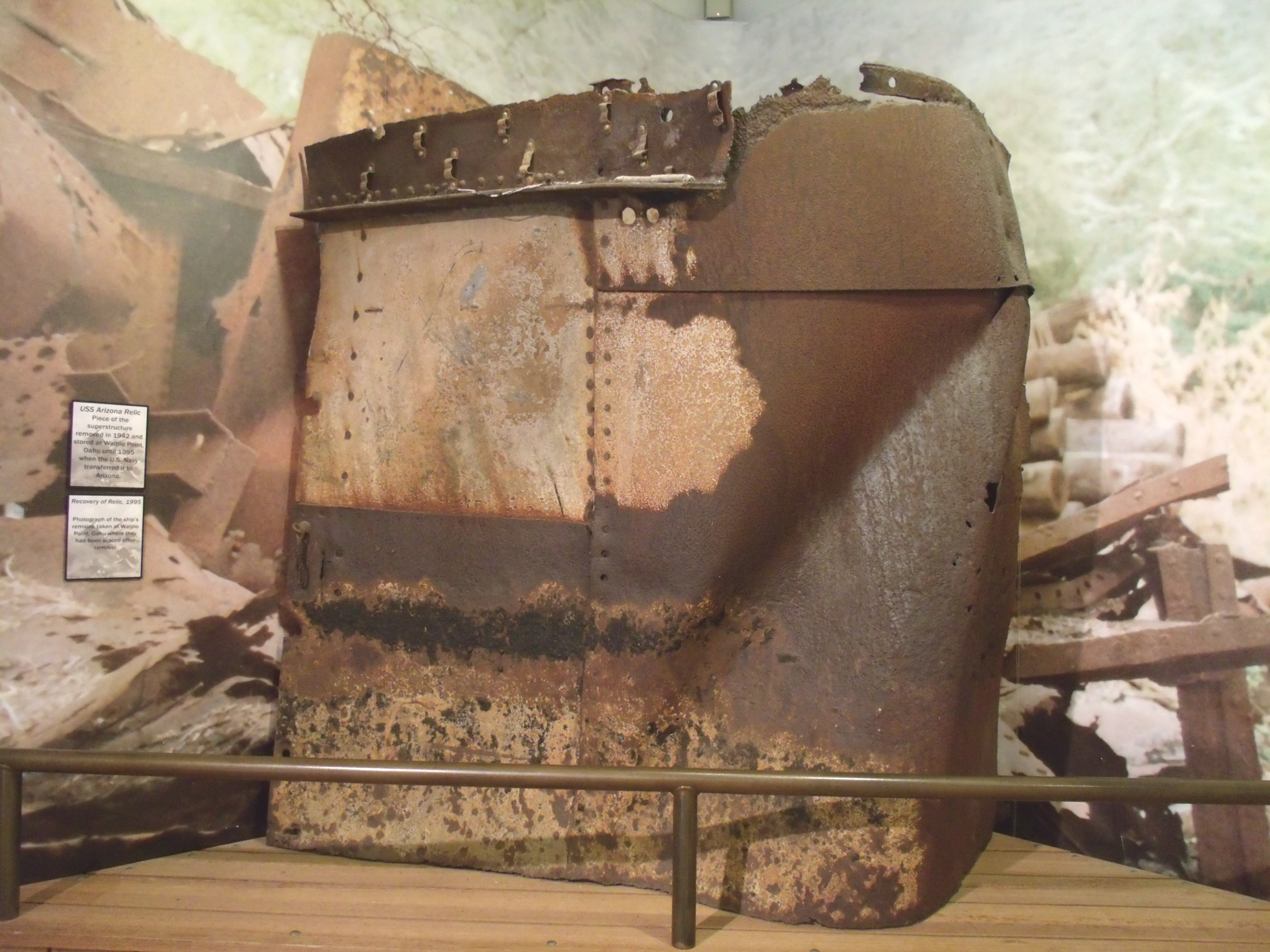
A piece of USS Arizona's superstructure which was salvaged and which is on display at the Arizona State Capitol Museum.

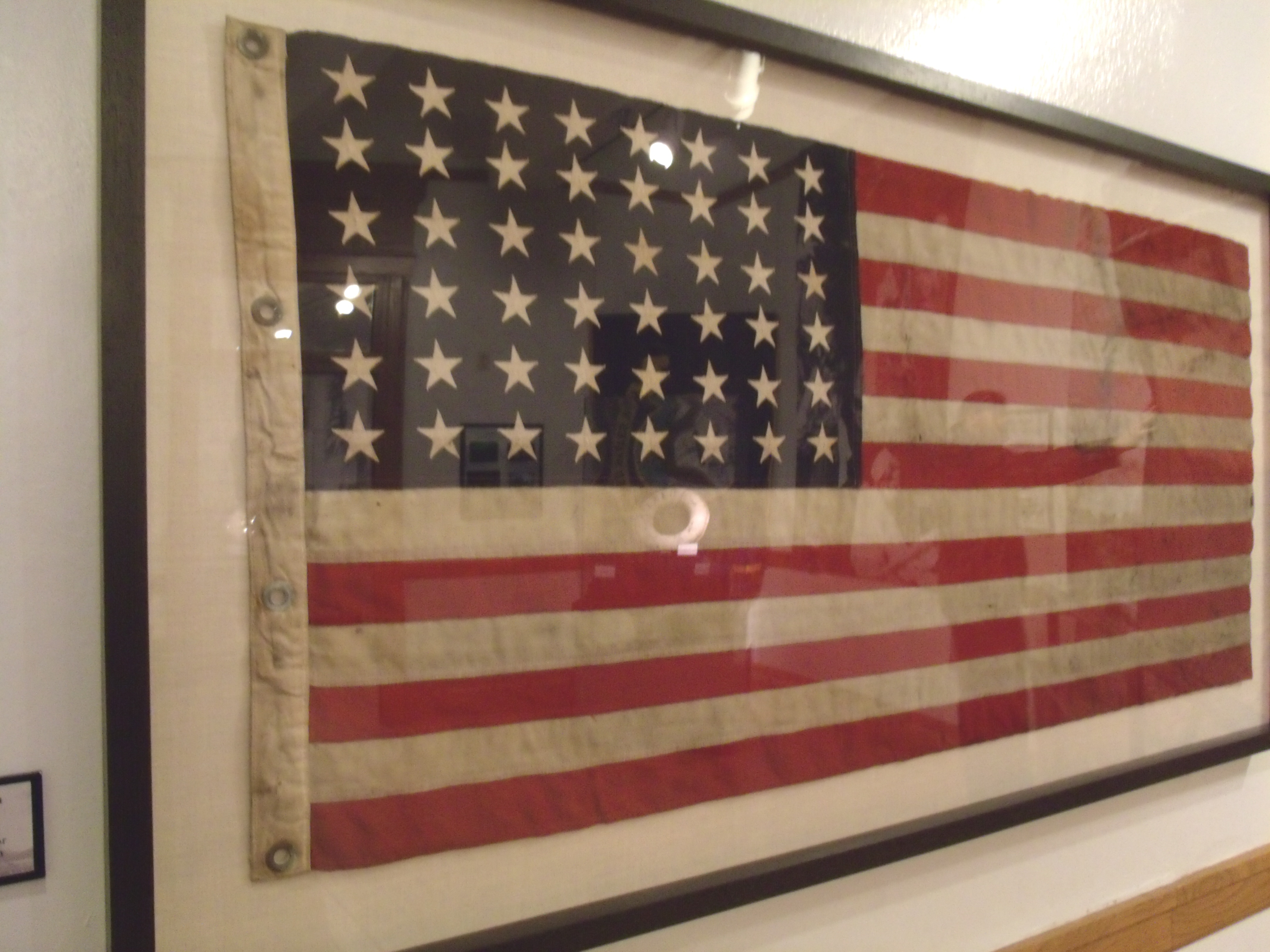
The U.S. flag that flew on the battleship USS Arizona when it sank during the attack on Pearl Harbor. The flag is on display in the first floor of the Arizona State Capitol Museum.

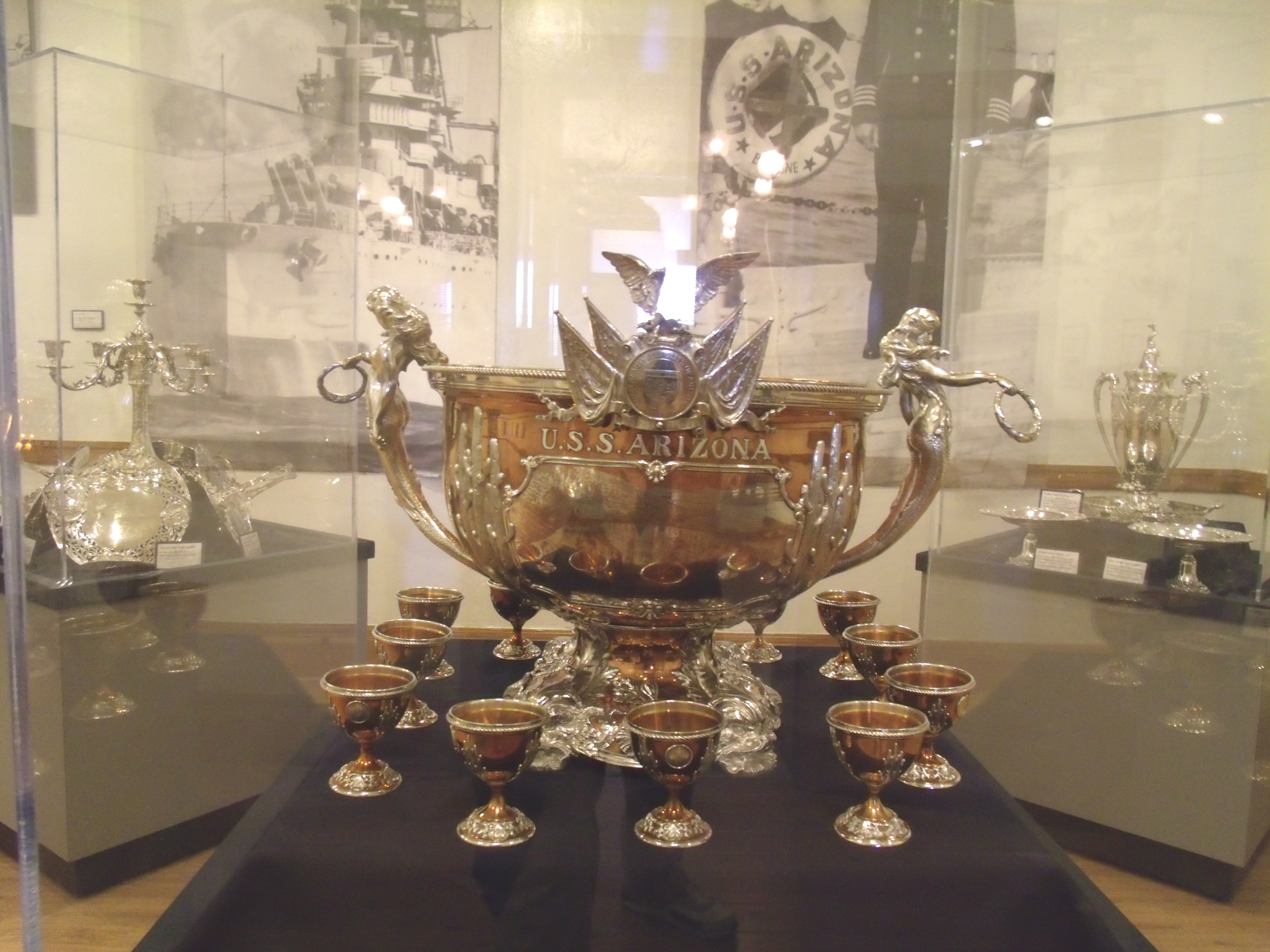
The Arizona Capitol Museum is home to the silver service (silverware) that was donated to USS Arizona by the citizens of Arizona in 1919. This service is composed of 59 distinct pieces on display at the Capitol Museum.

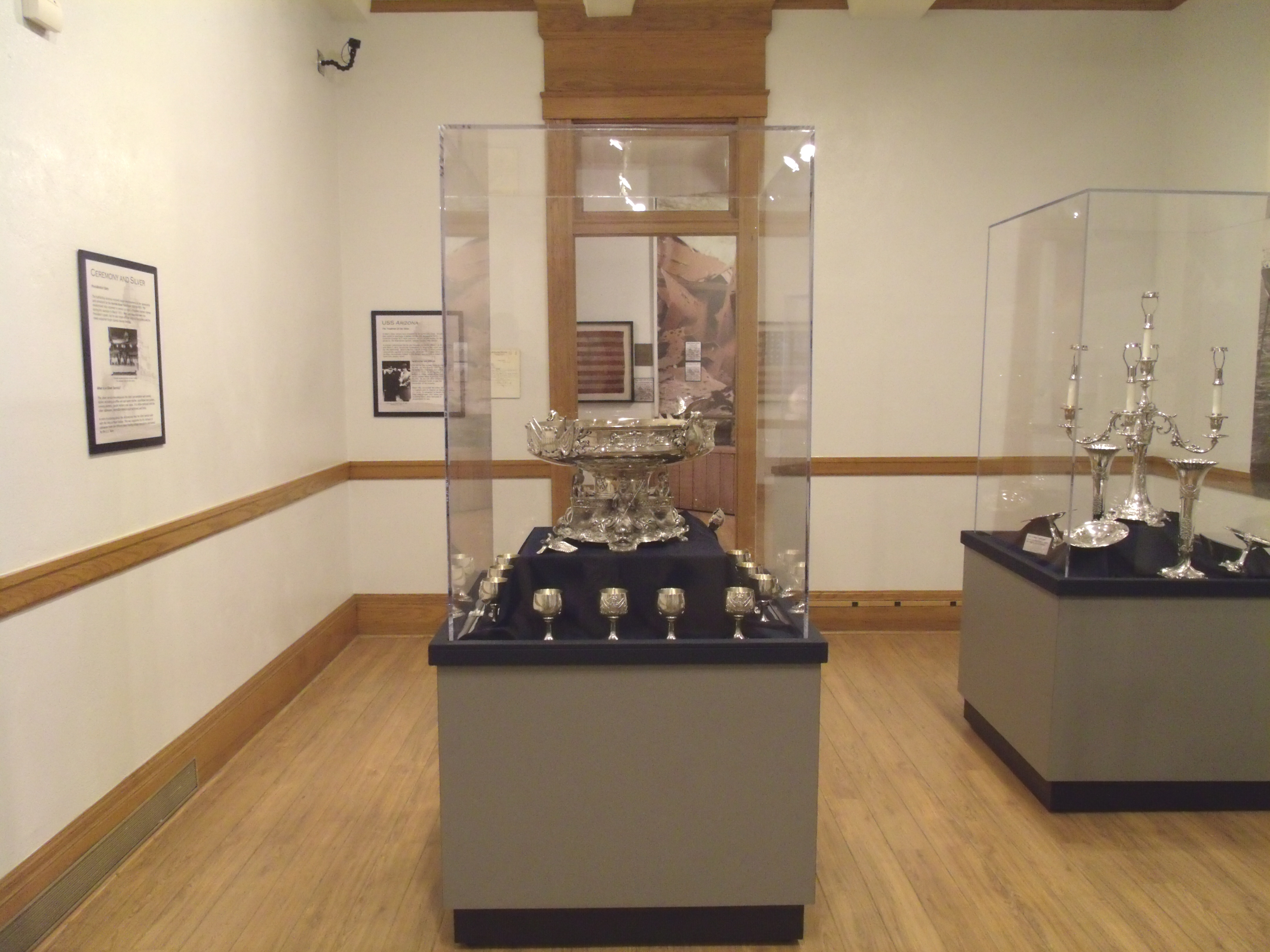
Additional silver service (silverware) that was donated to USS Arizona by the citizens of Arizona in 1919. on display at the Arizona Capitol Museum.

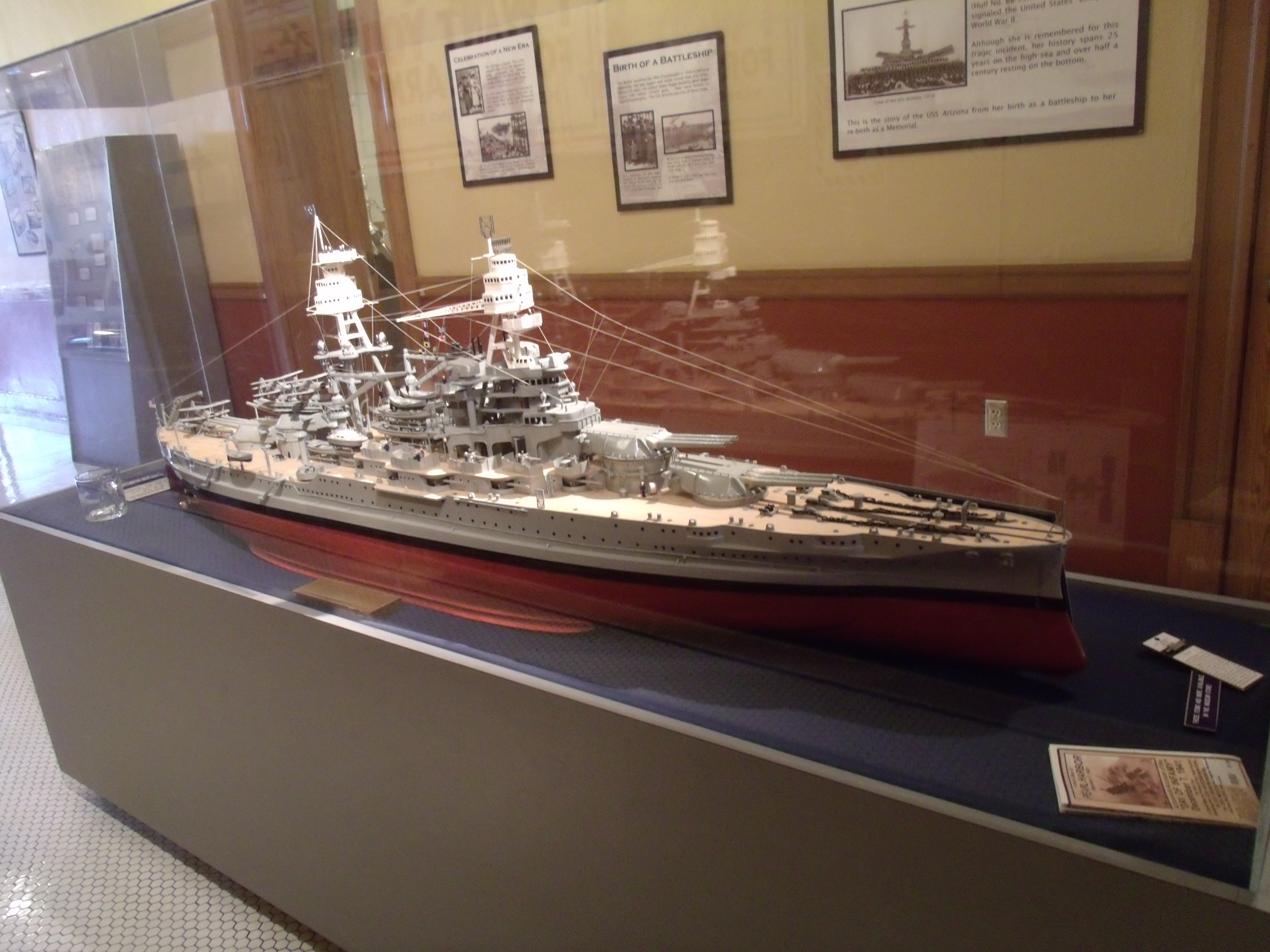
Model of USS Arizona at the Arizona State Capitol Museum.

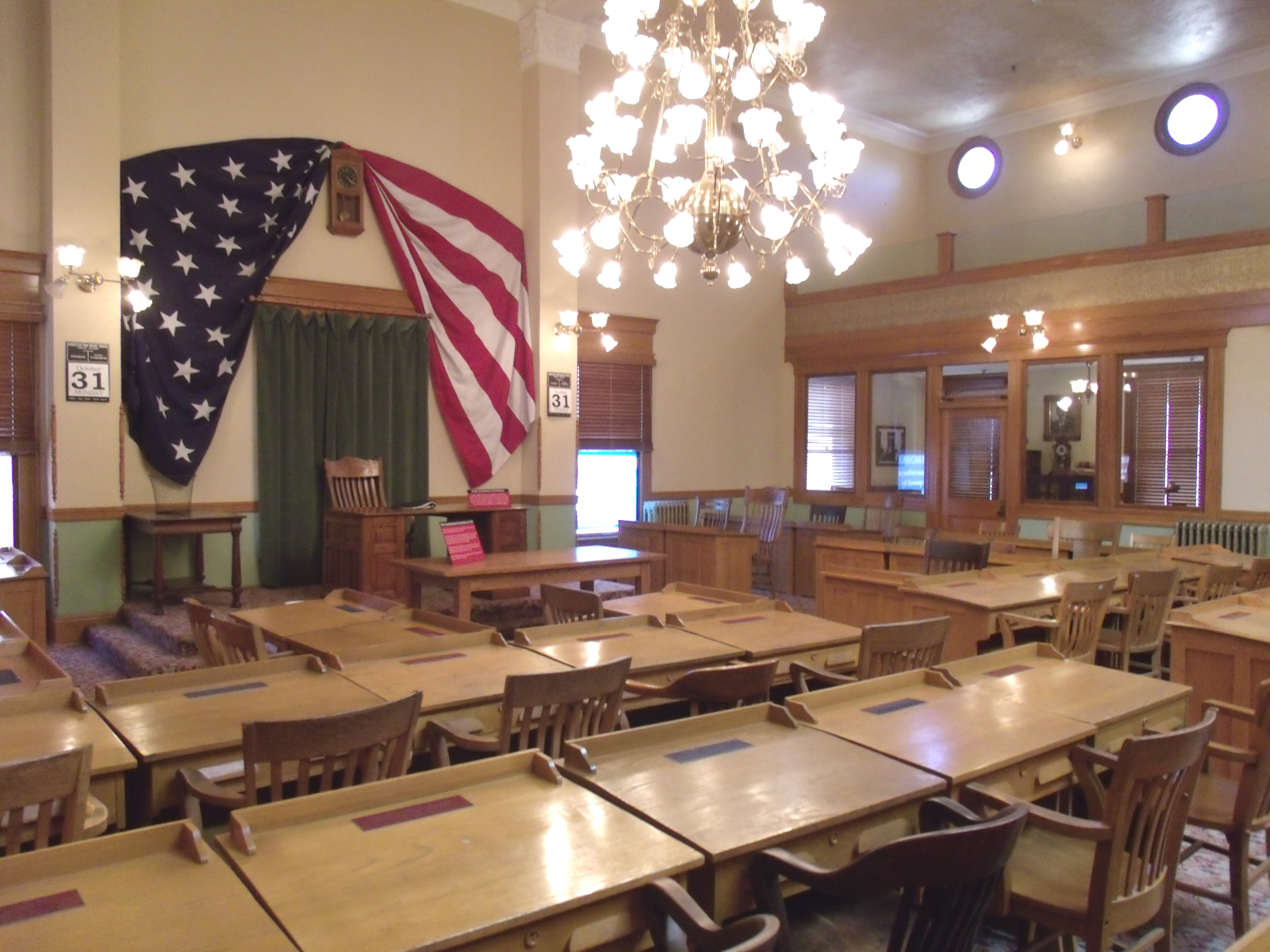
Inside the historic House Chamber. The Chamber is located on the third floor of the Arizona State Capitol Museum.

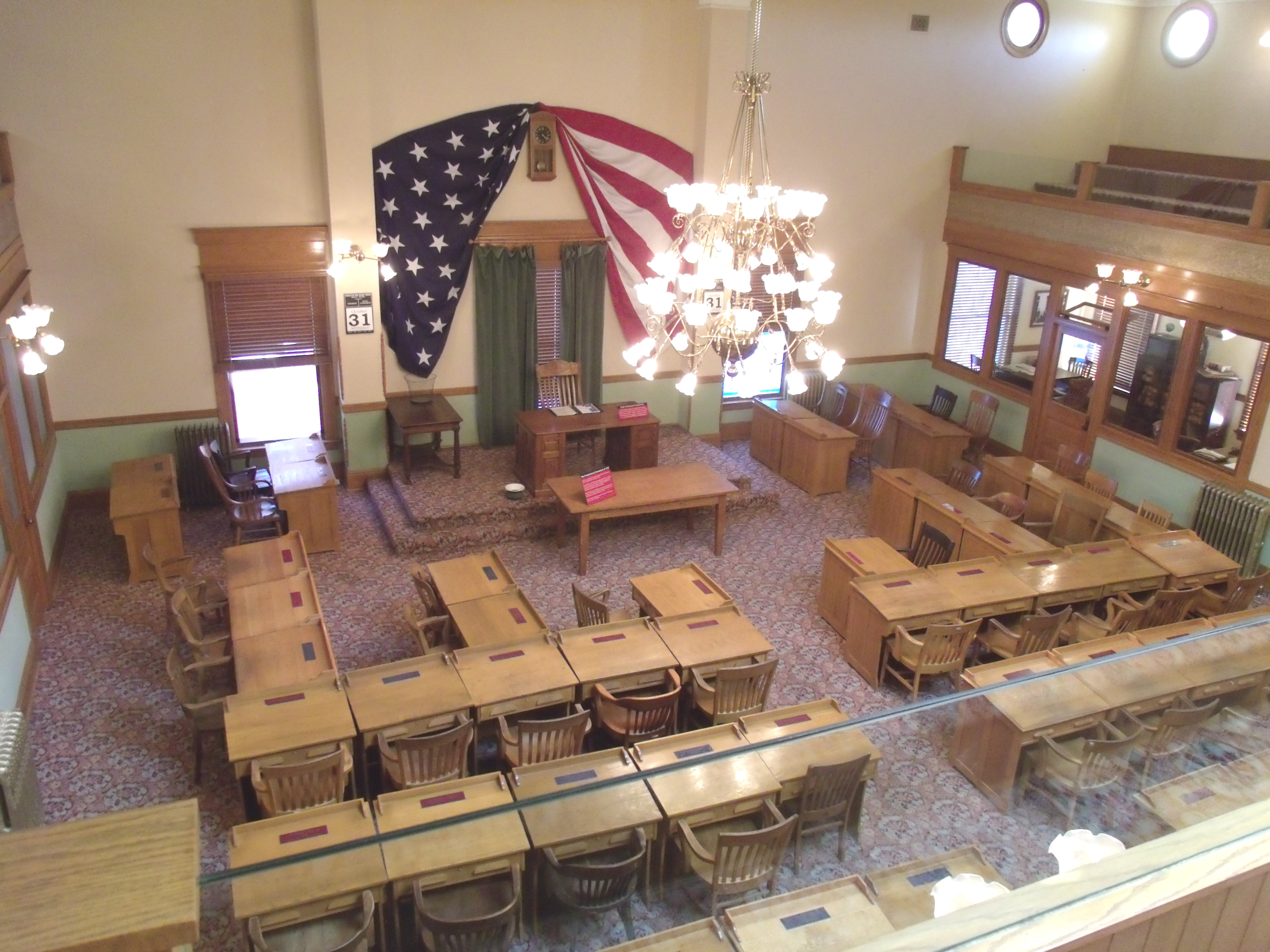
A view from the fourth floor of the Arizona State Capitol Museum looking down from the gallery into the original House Chamber.

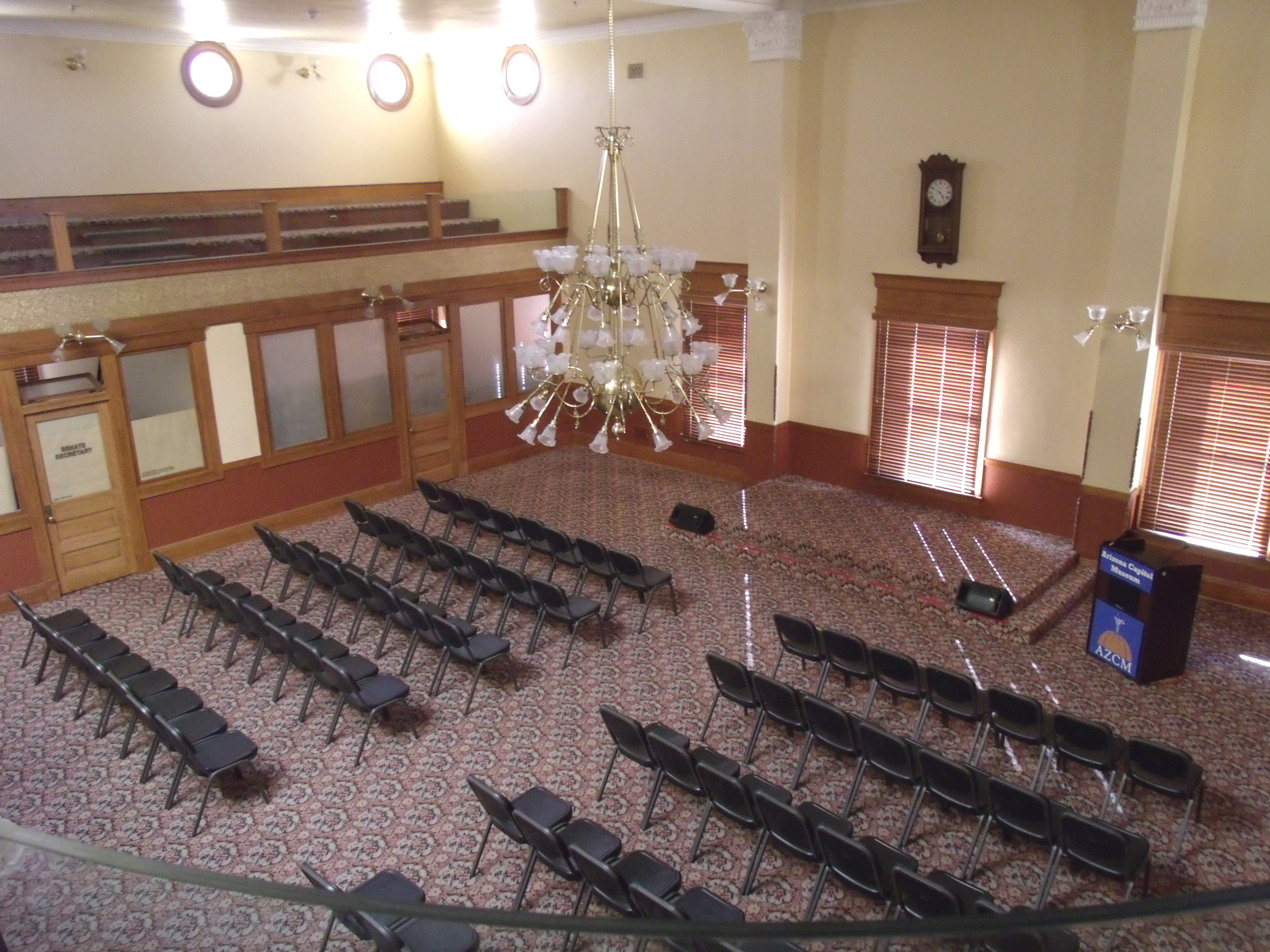
A view from the fourth floor of the Arizona State Capitol Museum looking down from the gallery into the original Senate chamber.

== See also ==
- List of Arizona state legislatures
- Downtown Phoenix
- Wesley Bolin Memorial Plaza
- USS Arizona salvaged artifacts
- List of state and territorial capitols in the United States

== Sources ==
- "Arizona's Capitol Building". The Arizona Graphic. 1 (5). Phoenix: 1–2. October 14, 1899.
- Ehrlich, Karen Lynn (Autumn 1981). "Arizona's Territorial Capital Moves to Phoenix". Arizona and the West. 23 (3). University of Arizona Press: 231–242. JSTOR 40169162.
- Farish, Thomas Edwin (1915). History of Arizona. Vol. 2. Phoenix: Filmer Brothers.
- Farish, Thomas Edwin (1916). History of Arizona. Vol. 3. Phoenix: Filmer Brothers.
- Farish, Thomas Edwin (1918). History of Arizona. Vol. 5. Phoenix: Filmer Brothers.
- Kelly, George H. (1926). Legislative History, Arizona 1864–1912. Phoenix: Manufacturing Stationers.
- Silverstein, Ken (July 2010). "Tea Party in the Sonora". Harper's. Vol. 321, no. 1922. Harper's Magazine Foundation. pp. 35–42.
- Hall, Dorothy; Wilson, Marjorie (July 26, 1974). "Arizona State Capitol Building". National Register of Historic Places Inventory—Nomination Form. National Archives and Records Administration. NAID 75610075.

Preceded by unknown	Tallest building in Phoenix; 1900–1924; 28m	Succeeded by Luhrs Building
