= Edwin Megargee =

American painter

- Born: Sylvester Edwin Megargee; 8 December 1882; Philadelphia, Pennsylvania, U.S.
- Died: March 13, 1958 (aged 75); New York City, U.S.
- Education: Georgetown University; Drexel University; Art Students League of New York
- Occupation: Painter
- Spouses: Jean Inglee; Esther Kimball
- Children: 1 son
- Relatives: Lon Megargee (cousin)

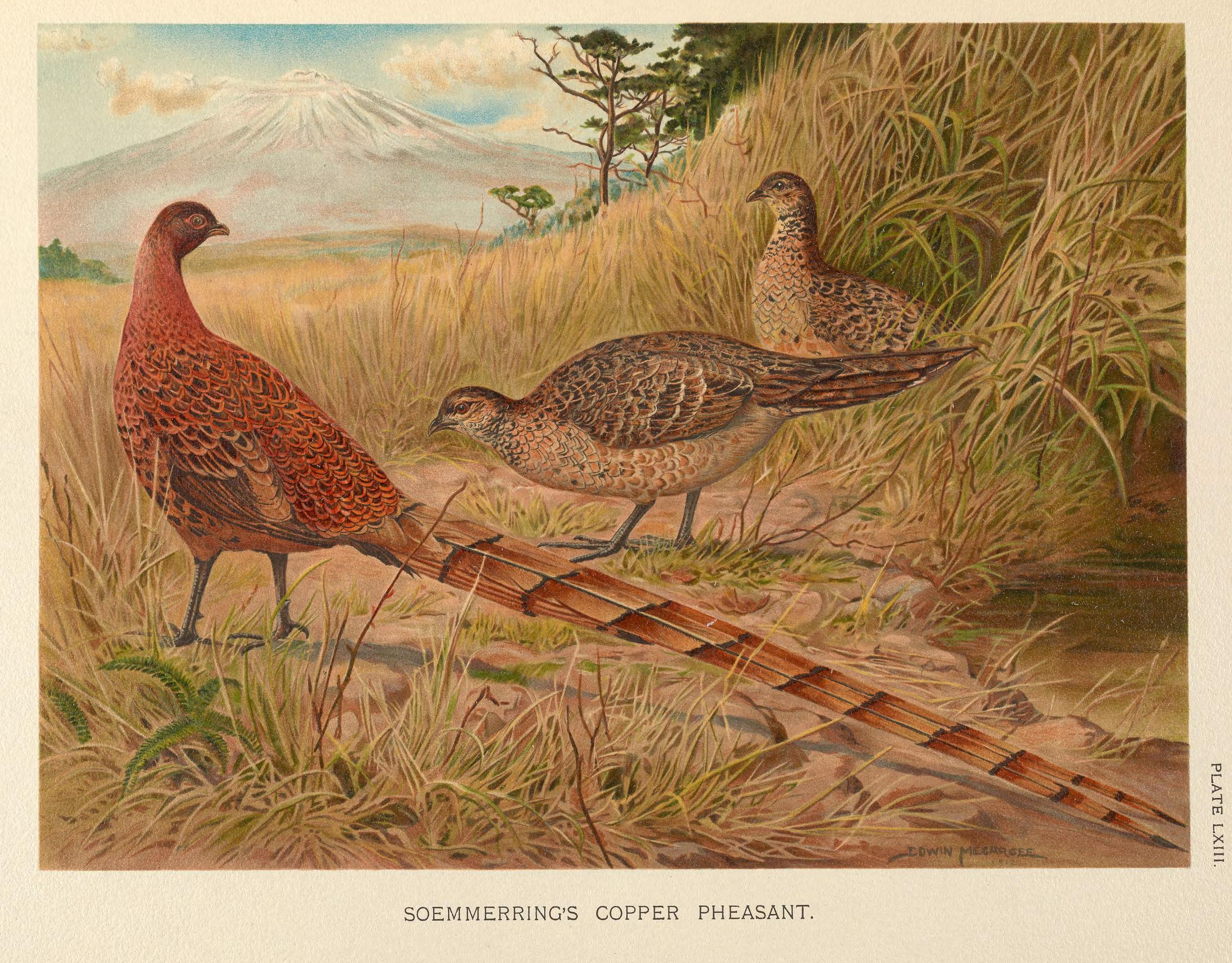
Soemmerring's Copper Pheasant by Edwin Megargee.

S. Edwin Megargee (1883 - March 13, 1958) was an American animal painter, illustrator and author. He did portraits of dogs, horses and cattle, and he authored several books.

== Early life ==
Megargee was born in 1883 in Philadelphia, Pennsylvania. His father was the Greek and Russian Consul for the city of Philadelphia. He attended Georgetown University, Drexel University, and the Art Students League of New York.

== Career ==
Megargee was an animal painter. He specialized in portraits of award-winning dogs and thoroughbred horses. He also did paintings of cattle.

Megargee authored and illustrated books about dogs. He was the chairman of the library committee and a judge for the American Kennel Club (AKC).

== Personal life and death ==
In 1931, Megargee was engaged to Dorothy Harper Graves. While the outcome of their relationship is unknown, Graves was still using her maiden name when she was engaged again in 1945.

On April 25, 1936, Megargee married Jean Inglee, whose father was the executive vice president of the AKC, in Dunellen, New Jersey. They had a son together, Edwin Inglee Megargee.

After their divorce, he married Esther Kimball Hartshorne on October 28, 1951. Esther was a writer, known for a book of poems about dogs titled DOG-GEREL, a play on the word doggerel. It was apparently a happy relationship; in his book The Sixties, her cousin Edmund Wilson wrote, "One of her friends said she had married a swell guy, but then he died and left her stuck with that name [Megargee]."

Before his marriage to Jean Inglee, Megargee was allegedly involved in an affair with Starr Faithfull, at the request of her mother and stepfather. According to the Faithfulls, they had approached Megargee after Dr. William Van Pelt Garretson, a psychiatrist treating Starr, had recommended that she "experience a normal sexual relationship" after being sexually abused by an older man, assumed to be Andrew James Peters.

Megargee resided at 159 East 37th Street in Manhattan, New York City. He died on March 13, 1958, at age 75.

== Selected works ==
- Megargee, Edwin (1942). Dogs. New York: Harper. OCLC 368078.
- Megargee, Edwin (1946). Horses. New York: J. Messner. OCLC 2831614.
- Megargee, Edwin (1954). The Dog Dictionary. New York: Grosset & Dunlap. OCLC 1867356.
