= Lon Megargee =

American painter (1883–1960)

- Born: Alonzo Megargee III; 1883; Philadelphia, Pennsylvania, U.S.
- Died: 1960 (aged 76–77); Cottonwood, Arizona, U.S.
- Education: Pennsylvania Academy of the Fine Arts; Los Angeles School of Art and Design
- Occupation: Painter
- Children: 1 son
- Relatives: Edwin Megargee (cousin)

Lon Megargee (1883–1960) was an American painter from Arizona. He did paintings of the Arizona landscape, Native Americans, and cowboys. His artwork is displayed at the Arizona State Capitol.

== Early life ==
Megargee was born in 1883 in Philadelphia, Pennsylvania. He lost his father at 13, and he spent his adolescence with his uncle, rancher Cornelius Borden, in Arizona. One of his cousins, Edwin Megargee, was a painter.

Megargee studied painting at the Pennsylvania Academy of the Fine Arts and the Los Angeles School of Art and Design.

== Career ==
Megargee first worked on his uncle's ranch as a teenager, and later as a cowboy in Wickenburg, Arizona. He moved to Phoenix, where he was a firefighter and a police officer.

Megargee did paintings of the Arizona landscape, Native Americans, and cowboys. He did 15 paintings for the newly built Arizona State Capitol in 1913-1914, and three more in 1934. He designed advertisements for the A-1 Brewing Company in 1948-1951. He exhibited his paintings at the Grand Central Art Galleries in New York City in 1956.

Megargee was called "Arizona’s first cowboy artist" by True West Magazine.

== Personal life and death ==
Megargee was "married at least seven times." He resided near Sedona, Arizona with his last wife, Hermine. Megargee had a son, Larry, who lived in California.

Megargee died in 1960 in Cottonwood, Arizona, at age 77.
