= Nordostbahnhof station =

Metro station in Nuremberg, Germany

Nordostbahnhof
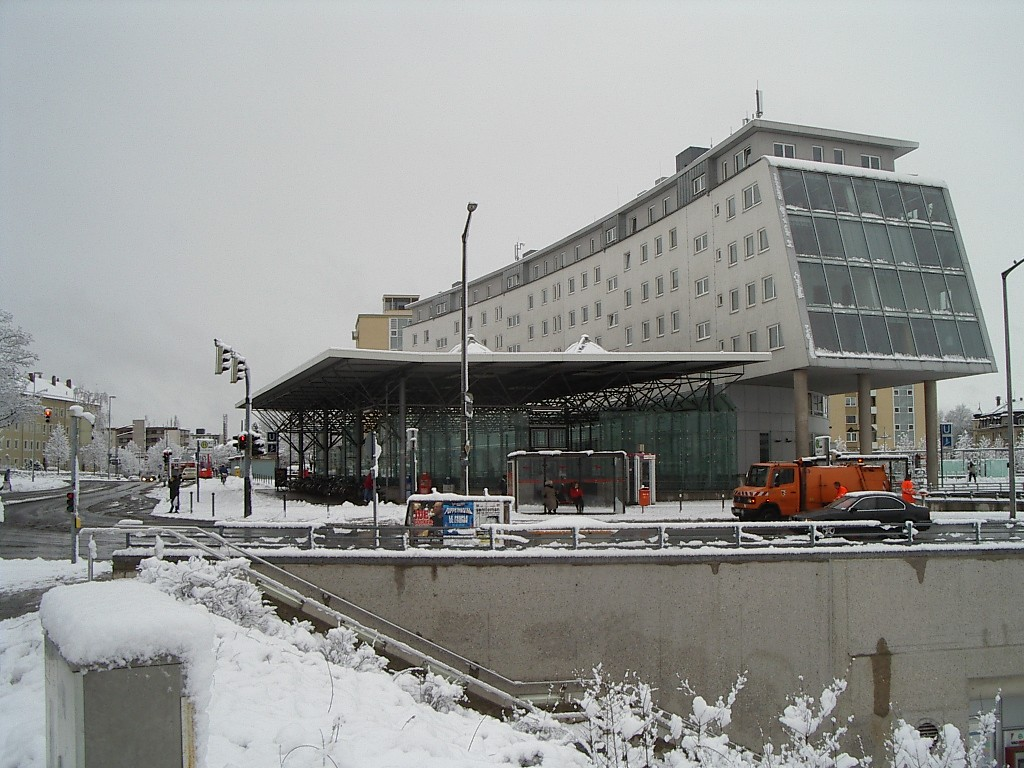

General information
- Location: Leipziger Platz; 90491 Nürnberg, Germany
- Coordinates: 49.4723°N 11.1045°E
- System: Nuremberg U-Bahn station
- Operator: Verkehrs-Aktiengesellschaft Nürnberg
- Connections: Bus: 30 Herrnhütte - Hugenottenplatz; 35 Nordostbahnhof - Röthenbach; 45 Mögeldorf - Ziegelstein; 46 Theresienkrankenhaus/Martha-Maria-Krankenhaus - Nordostbahnhof; 49 Martha-Maria-Krankenhaus - Nordostbahnhof; 65 Ostring - Röthenbach; 95 Mögeldorf - Nordostbahnhof; N1 Hauptbahnhof - Siedlungswerk

Construction
- Structure type: Underground

Other information
- Fare zone: VGN: 100 and 200

History
- Opened: 27 January 1996

Services
Preceding station	Nuremberg U-Bahn	Following station
Schoppershof towards Röthenbach	U2	Herrnhütte towards Flughafen
Location
- Location within Bavaria Location within Germany Location within Europe

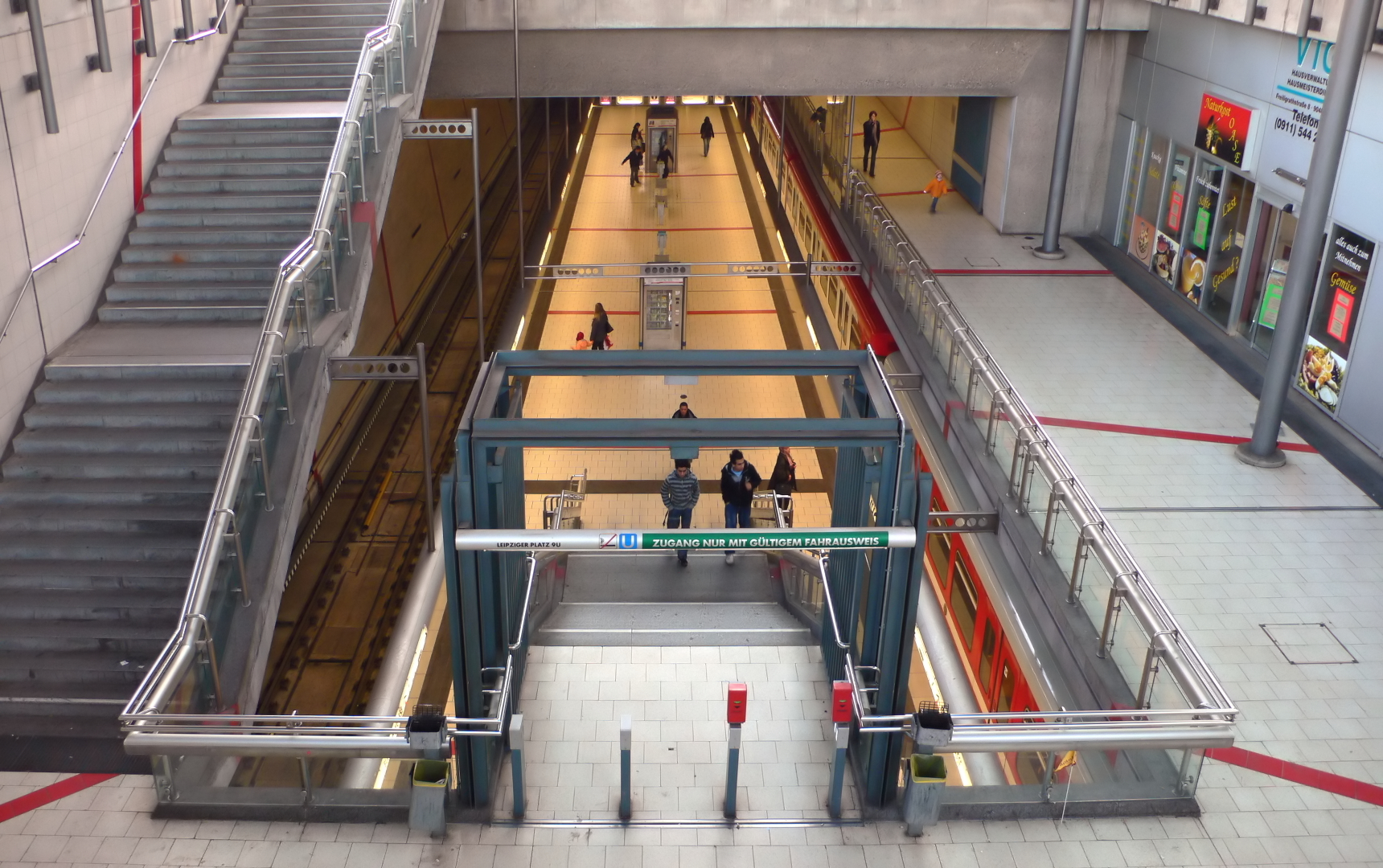
View into the station

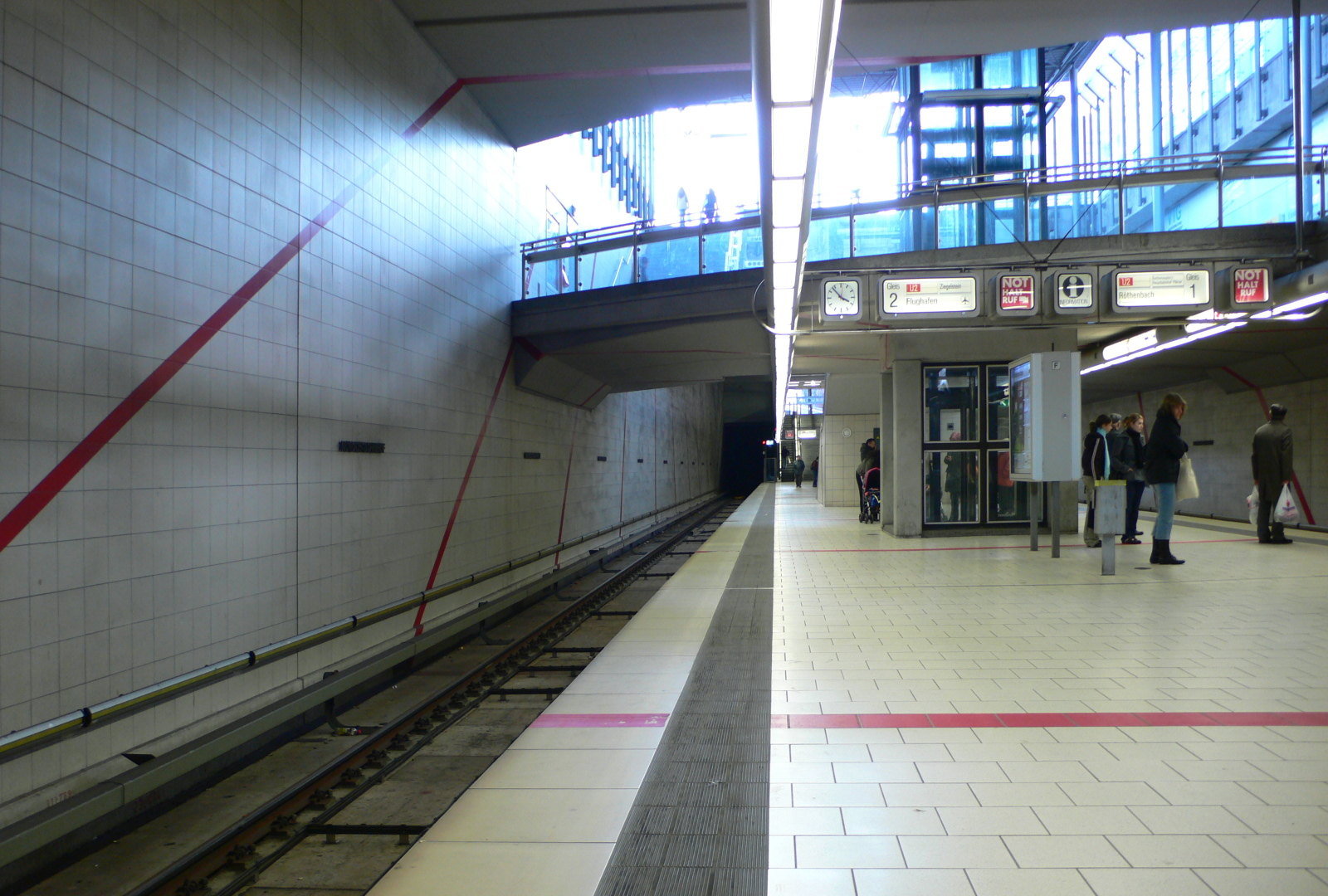
Platform level

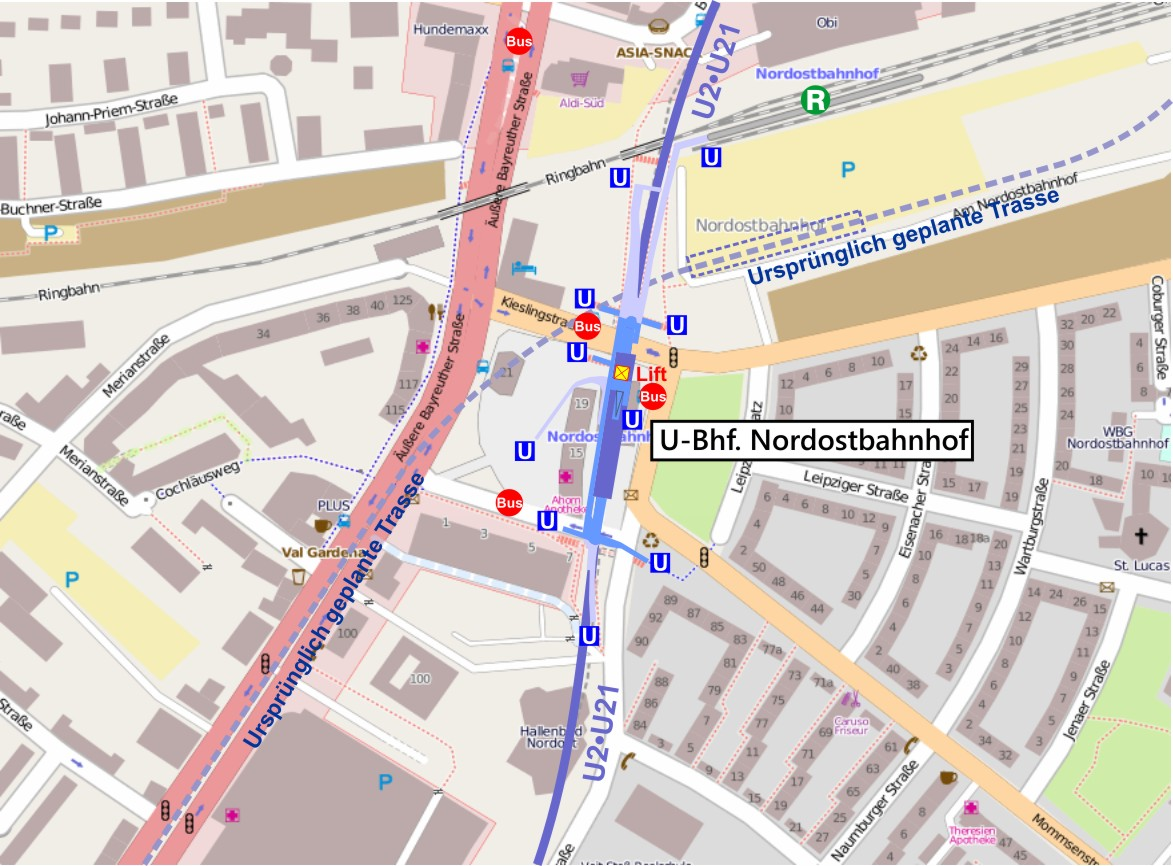
Location map of Nordostbahnhof

Nordostbahnhof station is the 34th underground station of the Nuremberg U-Bahn and was opened on 27 January 1996. It is 902m from Schoppershof underground station and 835m from Herrnhütte underground station. The station is connected to Rottenbach by a sharp track change and a parking and sweeping facility in the direction of the airport up to Herrnhütte underground station. The Nordostbahnhof was opened on 1 February 1908 as part of the Gräfenbergbahn. According to earlier plans, the station was to be called Leipziger Platz.

== Location ==
The station is located in Nuremberg's Nordostbahnhof district and extends in a north-south direction under Leipziger Platz between Mommsenstraße and Kieslingstraße. From both platform heads, stairways lead to a distribution floor spanning the entire platform area. From the south end of the distribution floor, stairways lead to the south side of Leipziger Platz, Elbinger Straße and Mommsenstraße, partly as ramps. From the north end of the distribution floor, staircases lead directly to Leipziger Platz and the bus station, to the north side of Kieslingstraße via a ramp to Nürnberg Nordost station and under the Nuremberg Ring Railway to Bessemerstraße. An elevator connects the platform level with the distribution floor and Leipziger Platz.

== Building and architecture ==
The station building is 160 m long, 17 m wide and 11 m deep. Construction work began on 1 June 1992 and was carried out using the open method with Berlin shoring (Berliner Verbau). When Leipziger Platz was completed, there should have been a four-storey office building above the underground station. The northern part of the station was left open at the top and protected against wind and weather by an easily removable temporary roof construction. To date, the plans have not been implemented in this form, so that the provisional roof construction is still above the open station.

The design of the station was entrusted to Johannes Peter Hölzinger, who at the time was professor at the Academy of Fine Arts, Nuremberg. He designed red colour ribbons which run vertically in the middle of the platform, inclined towards the end of the platform. These are intended to symbolise standstill, acceleration and braking of underground trains.

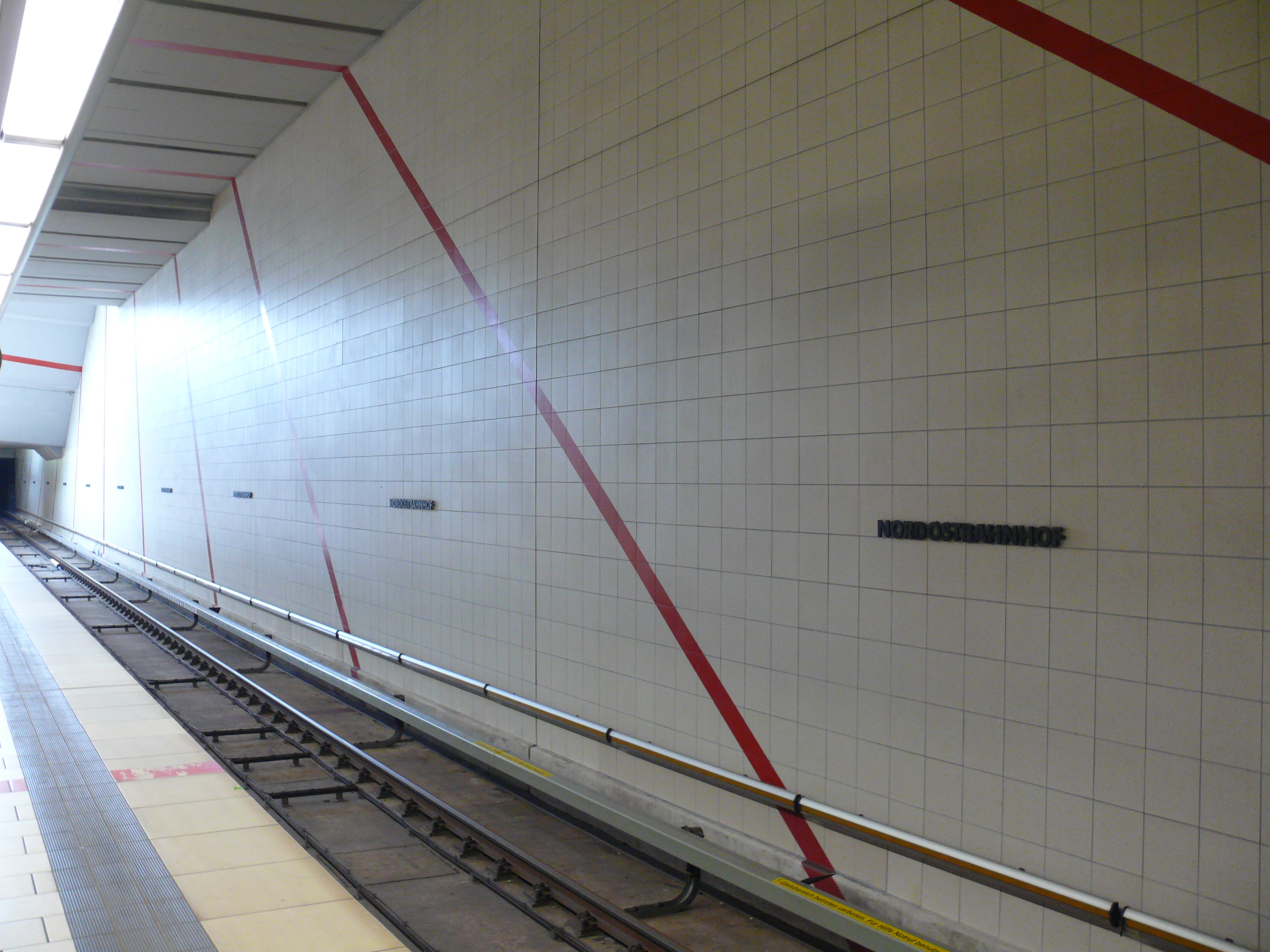
Station name and ribbons

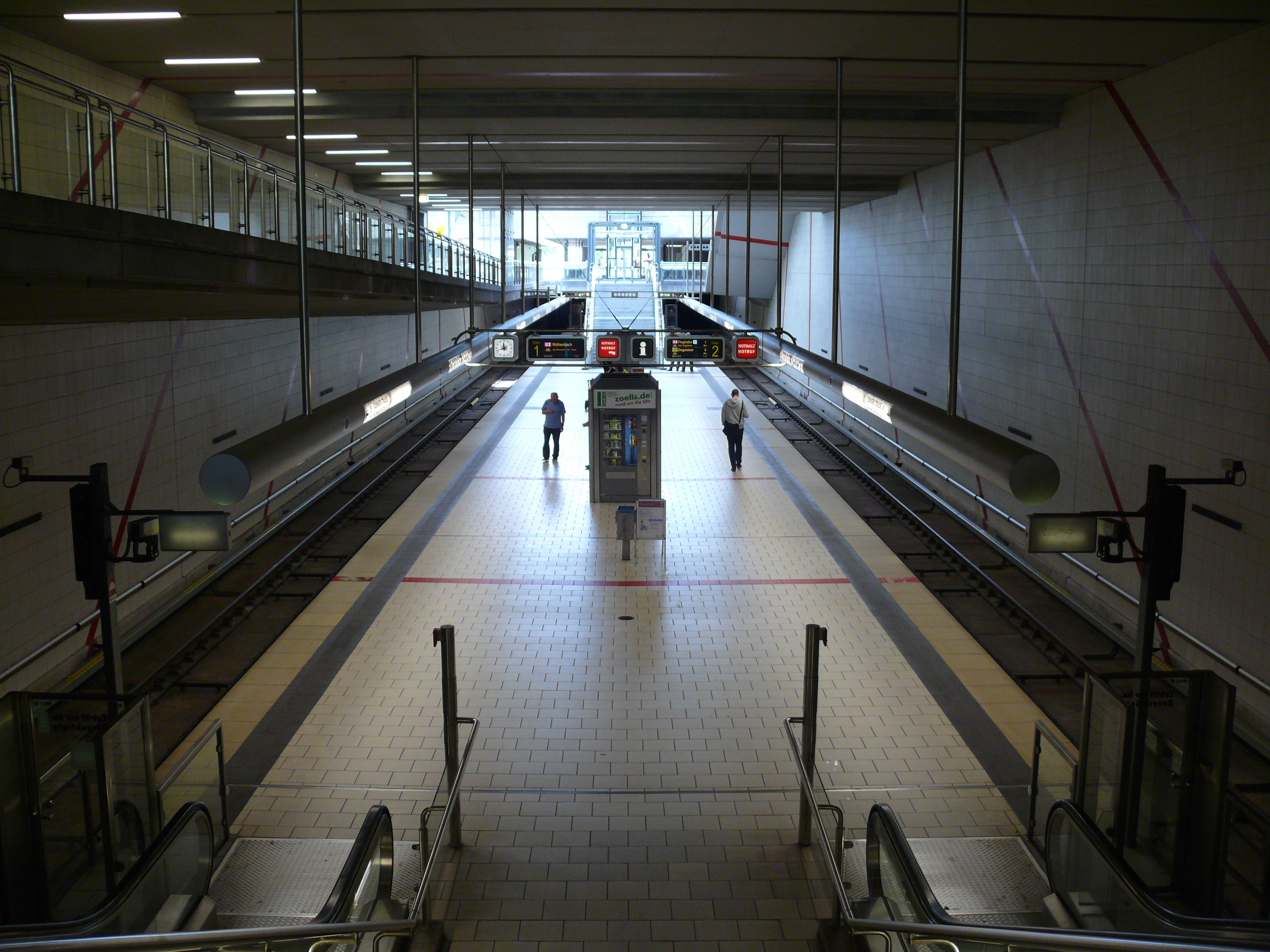
Platform level

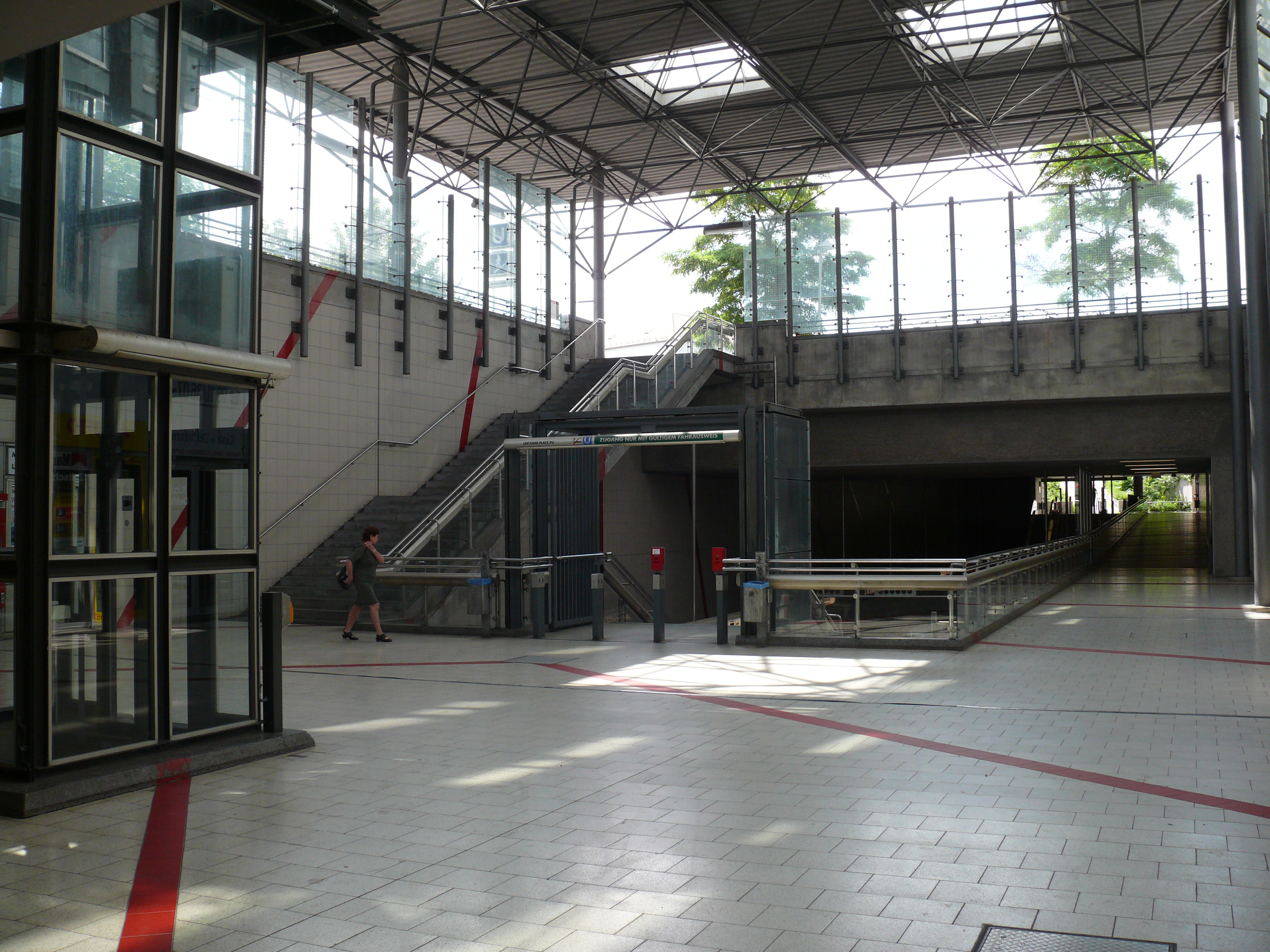
Station concourse with provisional roof construction above

== Traffic ==
The station is served by the underground line. On the surface there is a bus station, which is served by the city bus lines 30, 35, 45, 46, 49, 65 and 95, as well as the DB railway station Nürnberg Nordost, where the regional train line R21 starts. The night bus line N1 also operates on weekends and before public holidays.

== Literature ==
- Stadt Nürnberg/Baureferat (Hrsg.): U-Bahn Nürnberg 14. Presse- und Informationsamt der Stadt Nürnberg, Nürnberg 1996.
- Michael Schedel: Nürnberg U-Bahn Album. Robert Schwandl Verlag, Berlin 2007, ISBN 3-936573-11-5.
