= St. Leonhard station =

Metro station in Nuremberg, Germany

St. Leonhard
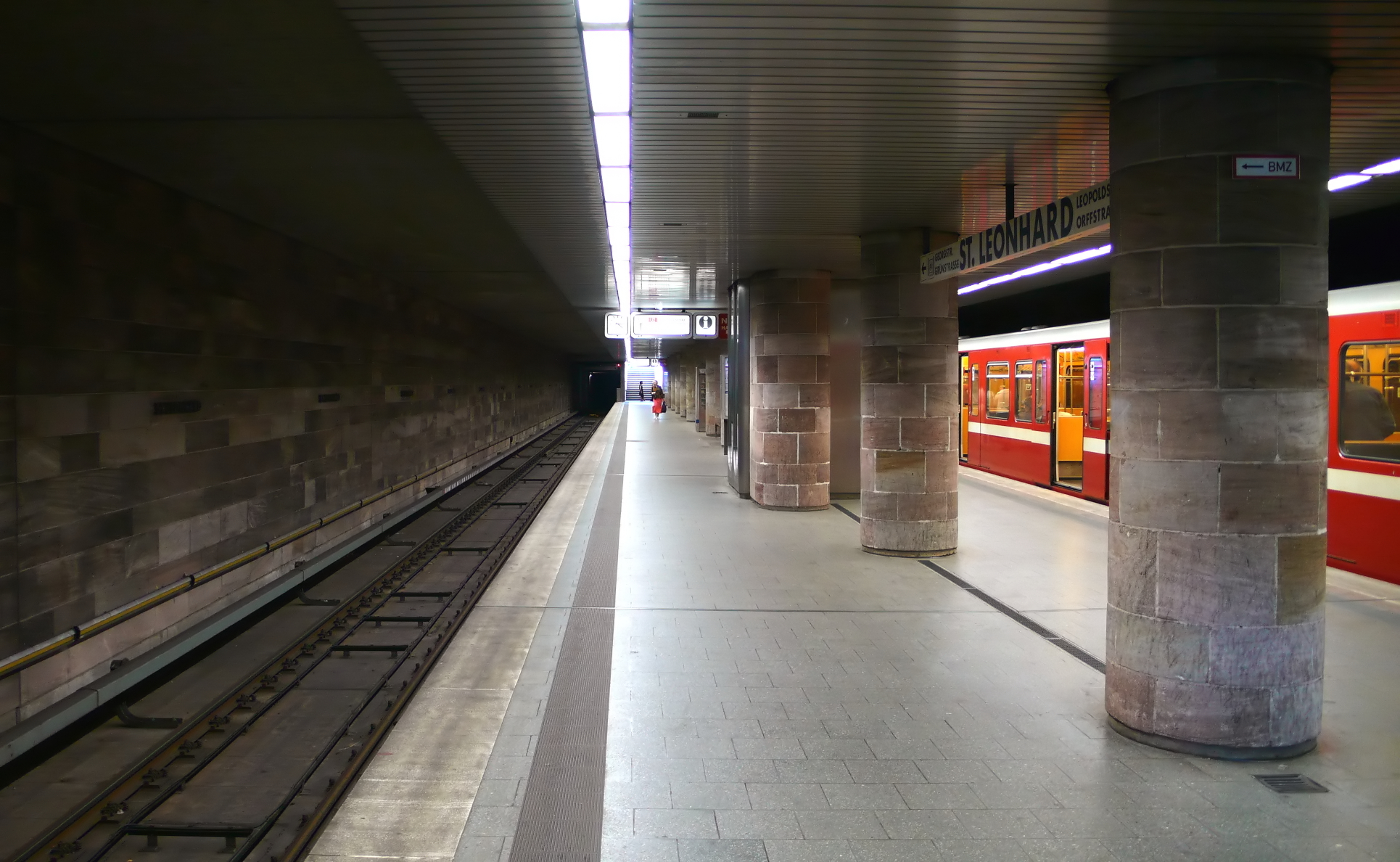

General information
- Location: Schweinauer Str. 90439 Nürnberg, Germany
- Coordinates: 49.4389339°N 11.0503624°E
- System: Nuremberg U-Bahn station
- Operator: Verkehrs-Aktiengesellschaft Nürnberg

Construction
- Structure type: Underground

Other information
- Fare zone: VGN: 100

History
- Opened: 28 January 1984

Services
Preceding station	Nuremberg U-Bahn	Following station
Schweinau towards Röthenbach	U2	Rothenburger Straße towards Flughafen
Location

St. Leonhard station is a Nuremberg U-Bahn station, located on the line U2.
