= Schweinau station =

Metro station in Nuremberg, Germany

Schweinau
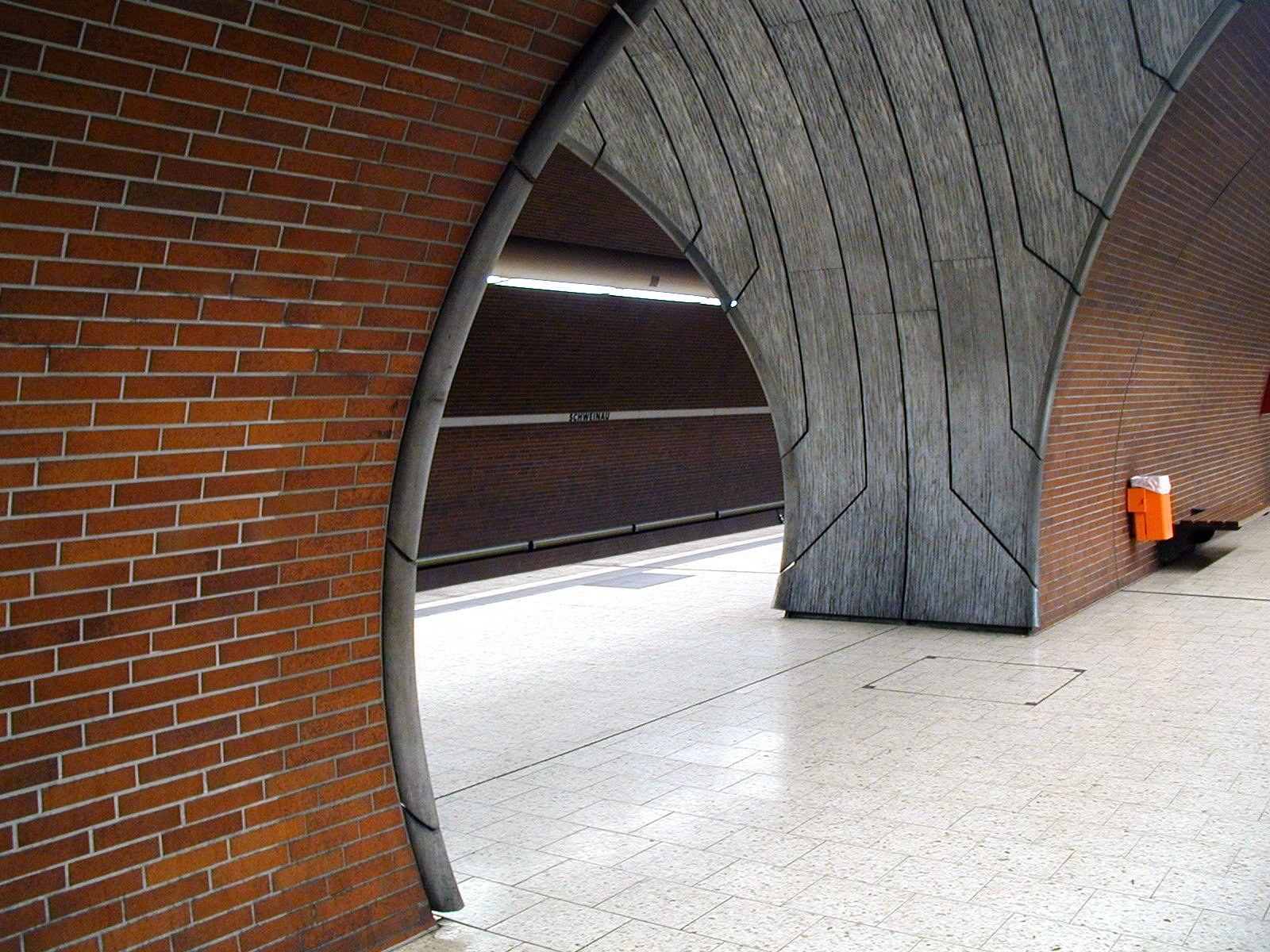

General information
- Location: Schweinauer Hauptstr. 90441 Nürnberg, Germany
- Coordinates: 49.4342383°N 11.0482244°E
- System: Nuremberg U-Bahn station
- Operator: Verkehrs-Aktiengesellschaft Nürnberg
- Connections: Bus: 68 Gustav-Adolf-Str. - Langwasser Mitte

Construction
- Structure type: Underground

Other information
- Fare zone: VGN: 100

History
- Opened: 28 January 1984

Services
Preceding station	Nuremberg U-Bahn	Following station
Hohe Marter towards Röthenbach	U2	St. Leonhard towards Flughafen
Location

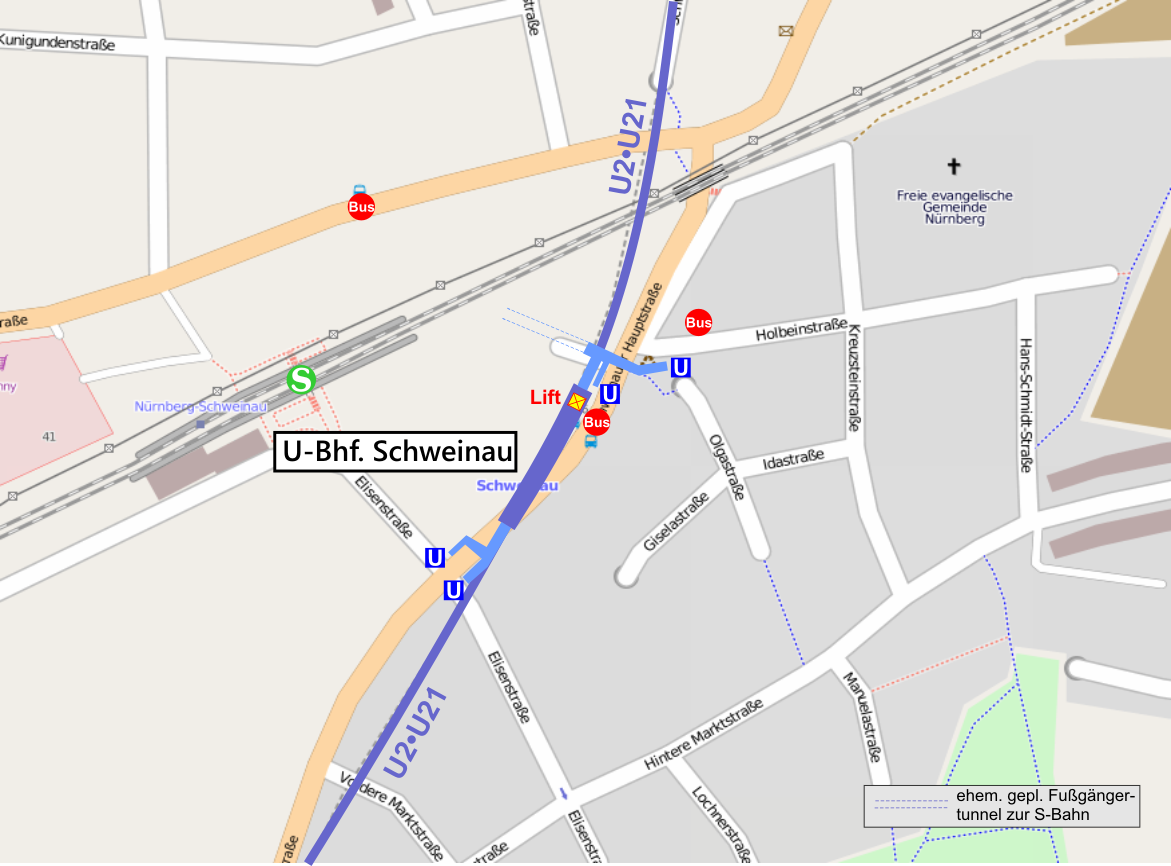
Location map of Schweinau

Schweinau station is a Nuremberg U-Bahn station, located on the U2.
