= Schoppershof station =

Metro station in Nuremberg, Germany

Schoppershof
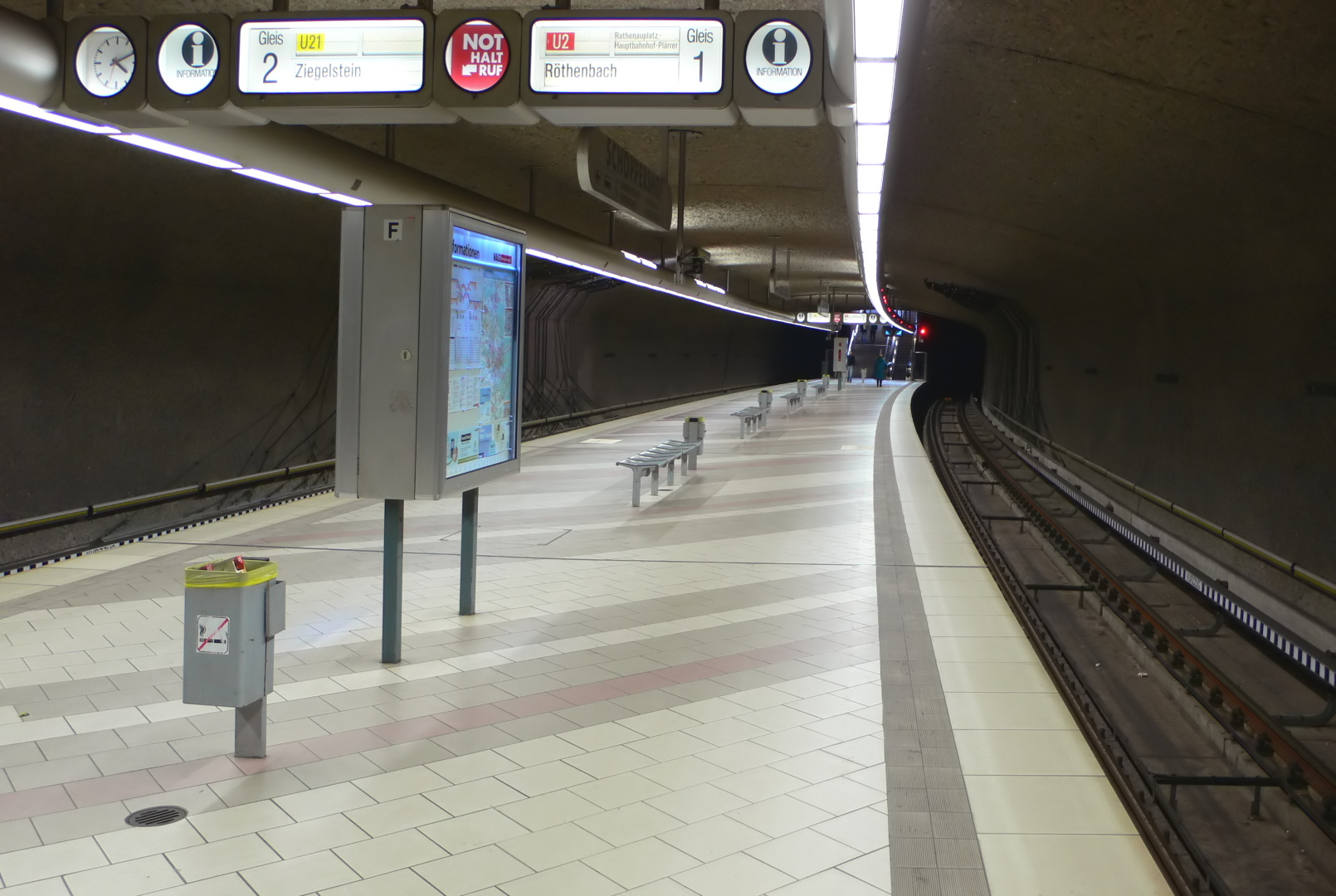

General information
- Location: Otto-Bärnreuther-Str; 90471 Nürnberg, Germany
- Coordinates: 49.4083831°N 11.1270115°E
- System: Nuremberg U-Bahn station
- Operator: Verkehrs-Aktiengesellschaft Nürnberg
- Connections: Bus: 45 Thon - Mögeldorf

Construction
- Structure type: At grade

Other information
- Fare zone: VGN: 100

History
- Opened: 22 May 1993

Services
Preceding station	Nuremberg U-Bahn	Following station
Rennweg towards Röthenbach	U2	Nordostbahnhof towards Flughafen
Location

Schoppershof station is a Nuremberg U-Bahn station, located on the U2.
