= Rennweg station (Nuremberg U-Bahn) =

Metro station in Nuremberg, Germany

Rennweg
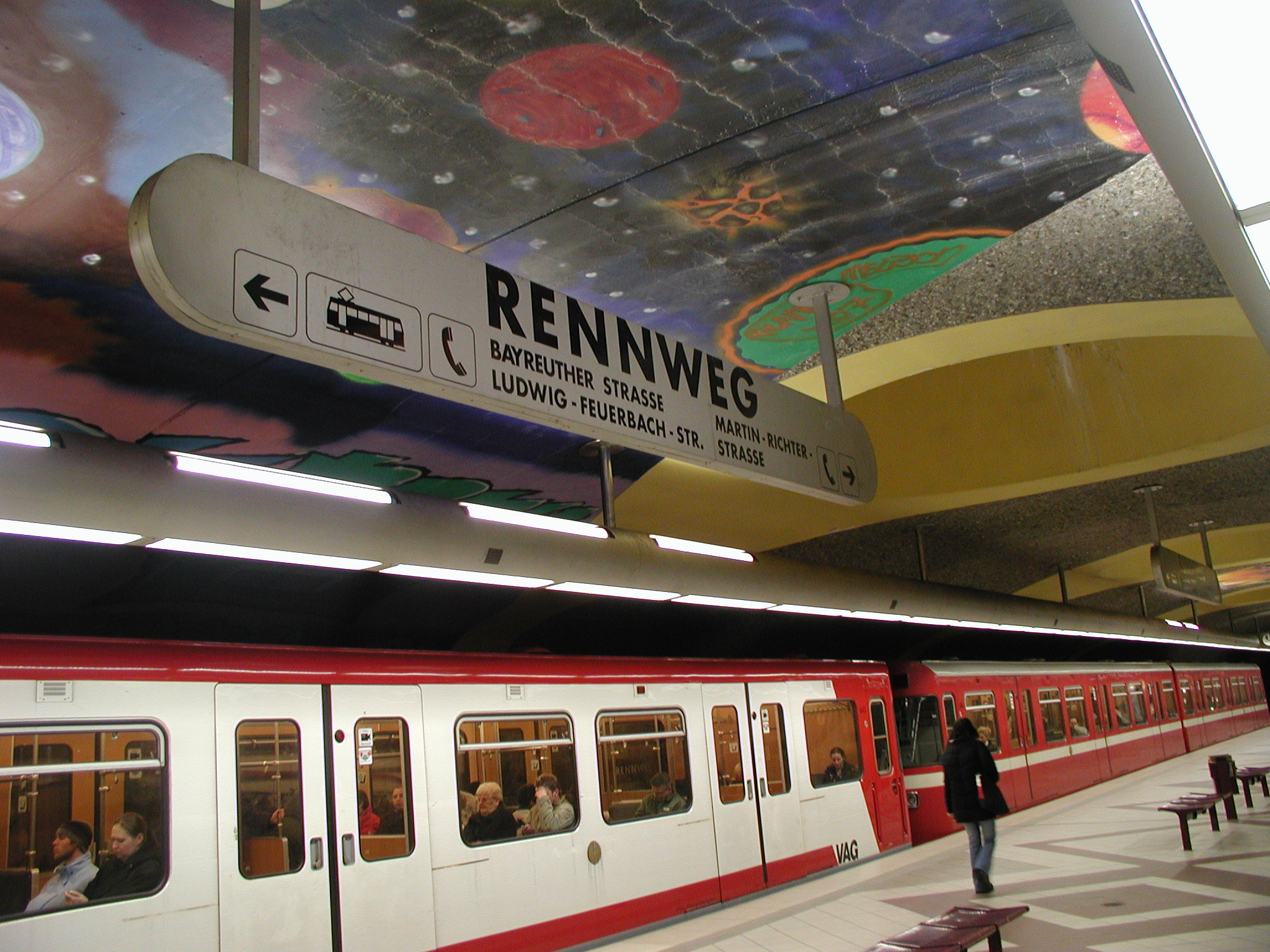

General information
- Location: Rennweg; 90489 Nürnberg, Germany
- Coordinates: 49.4606797°N 11.0929847°E
- System: Nuremberg U-Bahn station
- Operator: Verkehrs-Aktiengesellschaft Nürnberg

Construction
- Structure type: Underground

Other information
- Fare zone: VGN: 100

History
- Opened: 22 May 1993

Services
Preceding station	Nuremberg U-Bahn	Following station
Rathenauplatz towards Röthenbach	U2	Schoppershof towards Flughafen
Location

Rennweg station is an underground railway station on the Nuremberg U-Bahn, in Nuremberg, Germany, located on the U2.
