= Rothenburger Straße station =

Metro station in Nuremberg, Germany

Rothenburger Straße
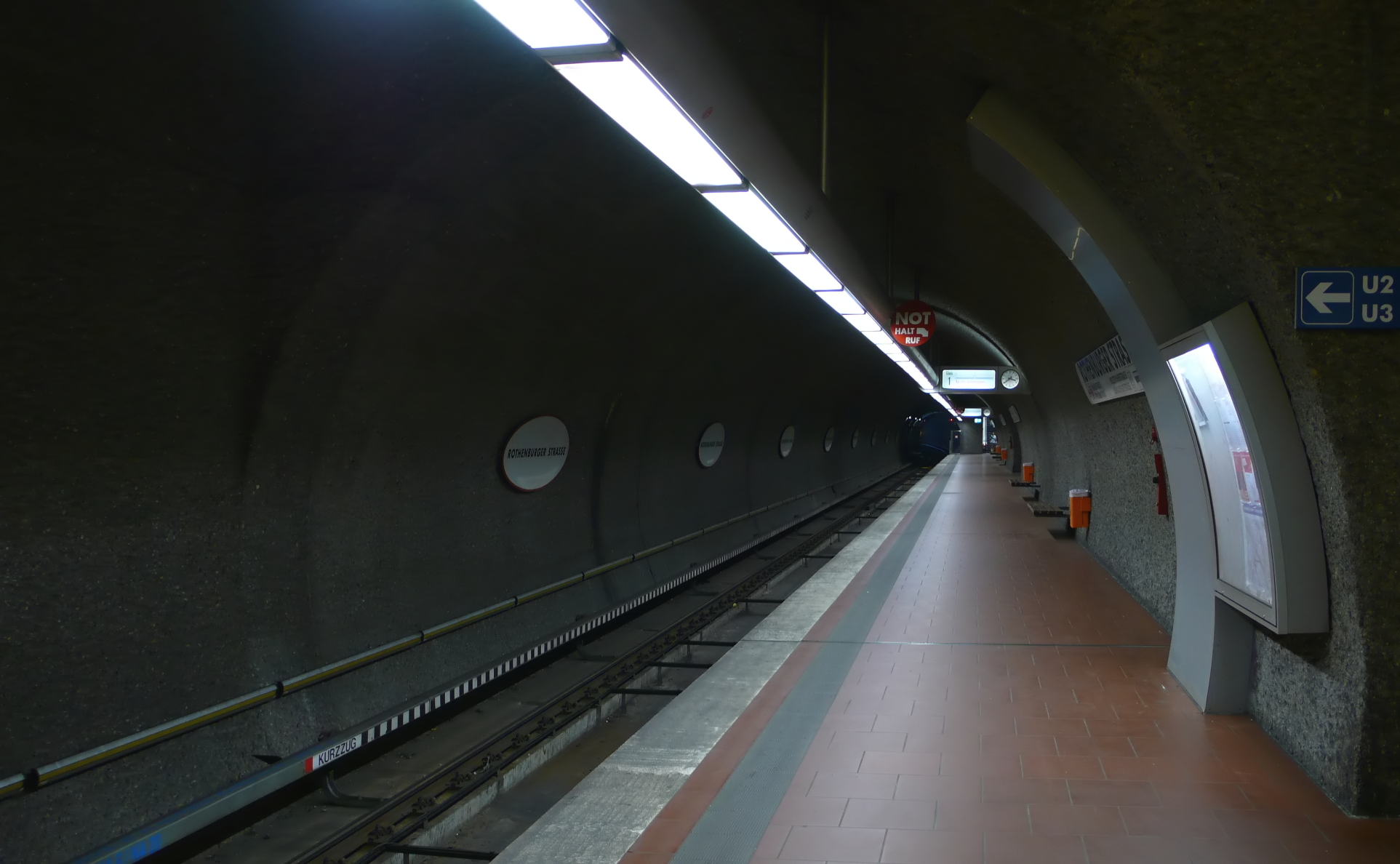

General information
- Location: Rothenburger Str. 90439 Nürnberg, Germany
- Coordinates: 49.4447061°N 11.0551538°E
- System: Nuremberg U-Bahn station
- Operator: Verkehrs-Aktiengesellschaft Nürnberg
- Connections: Bus: 113 Nürnberg - Unternbibert

Construction
- Structure type: Underground

Other information
- Fare zone: VGN: 100

History
- Opened: 28 January 1984

Services
Preceding station	Nuremberg U-Bahn	Following station
St. Leonhard towards Röthenbach	U2	Plärrer towards Flughafen
Sündersbühl towards Großreuth bei Schweinau	U3	Plärrer towards Nordwestring
Location

Rothenburger Straße station is a Nuremberg U-Bahn station, located on the U2 and U3. When traveling in a southerly direction it is the last station to be served by both U2 and U3. The station is connected to the Nürnberg Rothenburgerstraße station of the Nuremberg S-Bahn.
