= Plärrer station =

Metro station in Nuremberg, Germany

Plärrer
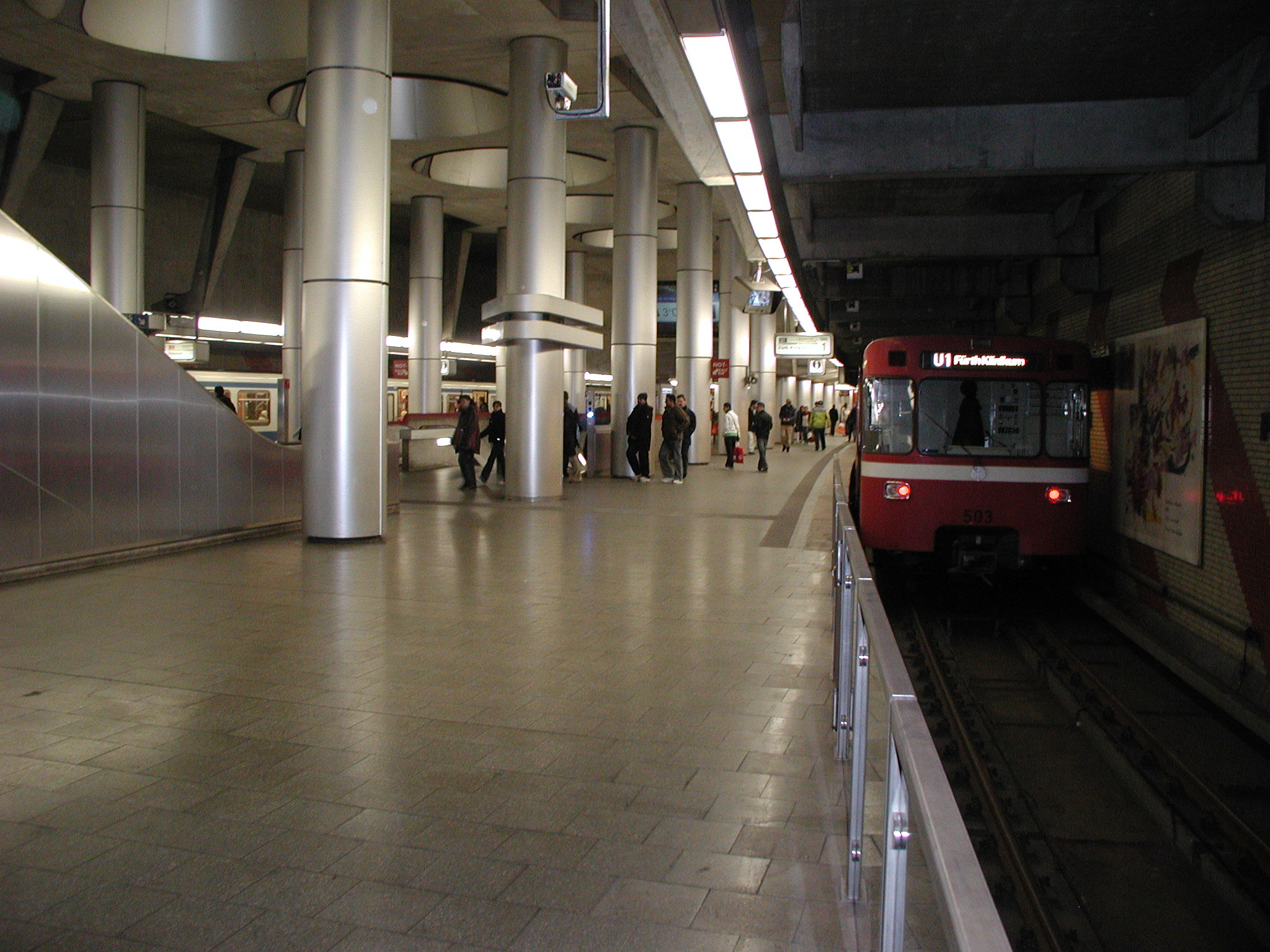

General information
- Location: Am Plärrer; 90443 Nürnberg, Germany
- Coordinates: 49.4481°N 11.0649°E
- System: Nuremberg U-Bahn station
- Operator: Verkehrs-Aktiengesellschaft Nürnberg
- Tracks: 4
- Connections: Tram: Gibitzenhof – Am Wegfeld; Doku-Zentrum – Westfriedhof; Dutzendteich – Am Wegfeld; Bus: 34 Plärrer - Friedrich-Ebert-Platz West; 36 Plärrer - Doku-Zentrum

Construction
- Structure type: Underground

Other information
- Fare zone: VGN: 100

History
- Opened: 20 September 1980

Services
| Preceding station | Nuremberg U-Bahn | Following station |
|---|---|---|
| Gostenhof towards Fürth Hardhöhe | U1 | Weißer Turm towards Langwasser Süd |
| Rothenburger Straße towards Röthenbach | U2 | Opernhaus towards Flughafen |
| Rothenburger Straße towards Großreuth bei Schweinau | U3 | Opernhaus towards Nordwestring |
Location

Plärrer station is the only Nuremberg U-Bahn station apart from Nürnberg Hauptbahnhof to have an interchange with all the U-Bahn lines – the U1, U2, and U3. Like Aufseßplatz, Hauptbahnhof and Friedrich Ebert Platz orange tiles indicate its intended use as an interchange station between different subway main lines. The station is named after the Plärrer, long an important interchange of various types of transportation including the site of the Nuremberg terminus for the Bavarian Ludwig Railway. Despite folk etymology linking the name to the local word "plärren" for screaming, it likely derives from Plarre a now disused word for a square.
