= Ziegelstein station =

Metro station in Nuremberg, Germany

Ziegelstein
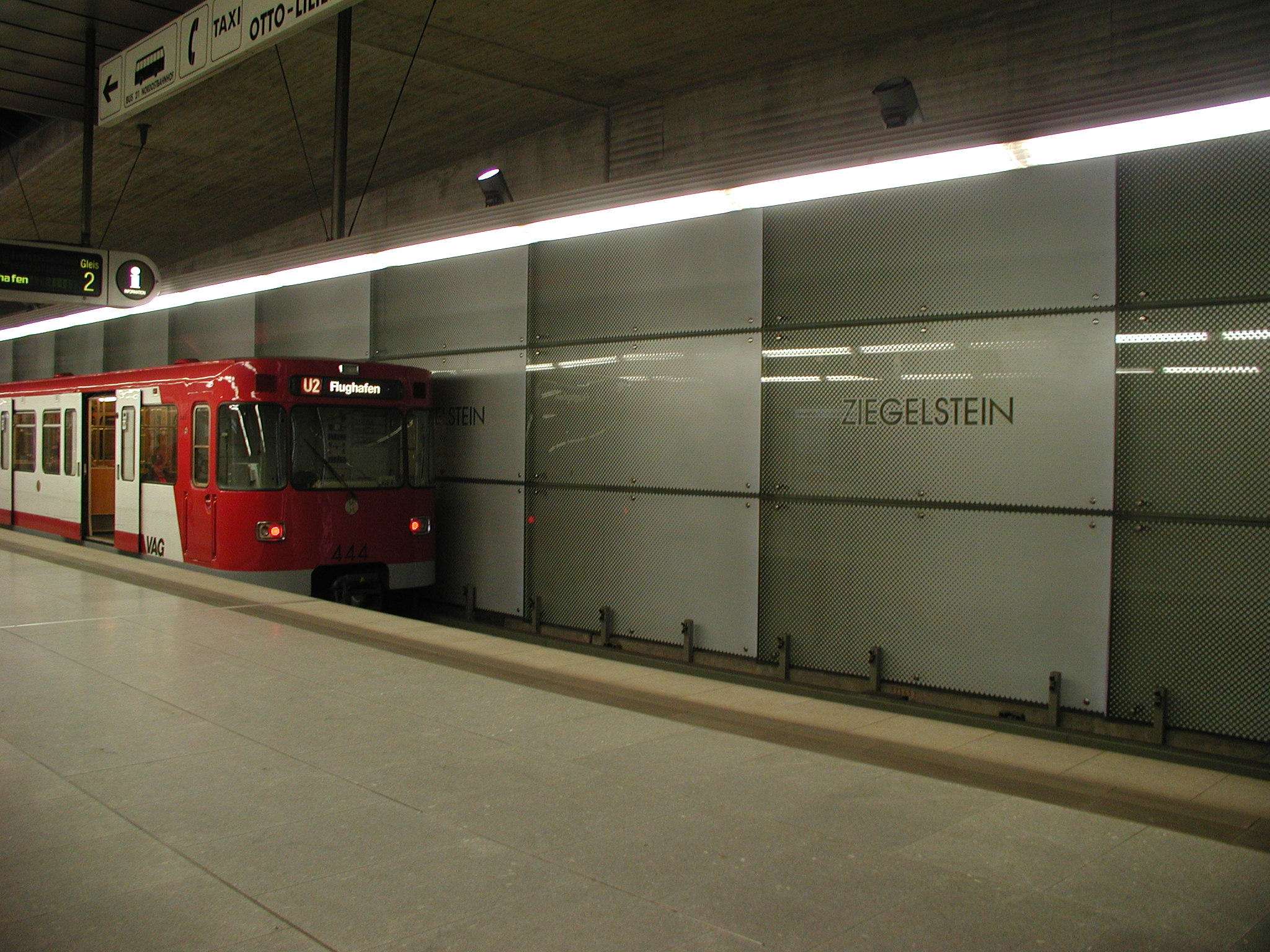

General information
- Location: Ziegelsteinstr. 90411 Nürnberg, Germany
- Coordinates: 49.4850325°N 11.1052561°E
- System: Nuremberg U-Bahn station
- Operator: Verkehrs-Aktiengesellschaft Nürnberg
- Tracks: 2
- Connections: Bus: 21 Ziegelstein - Buchenbühl; 22 Thon - Herrnhütte

Construction
- Structure type: Underground

Other information
- Fare zone: VGN: 200

History
- Opened: 27 September 1999

Services
Preceding station	Nuremberg U-Bahn	Following station
Herrnhütte towards Röthenbach	U2	Flughafen Terminus
Location

Ziegelstein station is a Nuremberg U-Bahn station, located on the U2 line and operated by the Verkehrs-Aktiengesellschaft Nürnberg.

As the track between Ziegelstein and the terminus of U2 at Flughafen is single track without passing loops, about two thirds of all U2 trains terminate here during the day. Prior to 2017, these early terminating U2 trains were signalled "U21". The word "Ziegelstein" refers to the neighborhood the station serves, but is also the German word for brick.

== Future plans ==
As the stretch between Ziegelstein and Flughafen is both the longest in the system and one of the longest single track sections in any metro system in Germany, there have been debates about both an infill station and the upgrading of the line to double track operations or at least the addition of a passing loop at a "strategic" location to increase capacity. There is an emergency exit near the proposed site of a future "Marienberg" station, but as of 2021 the idea of building this station has been indefinitely shelved on cost grounds.
