= Herrnhütte station =

Metro station in Nuremberg, Germany

Herrnhütte
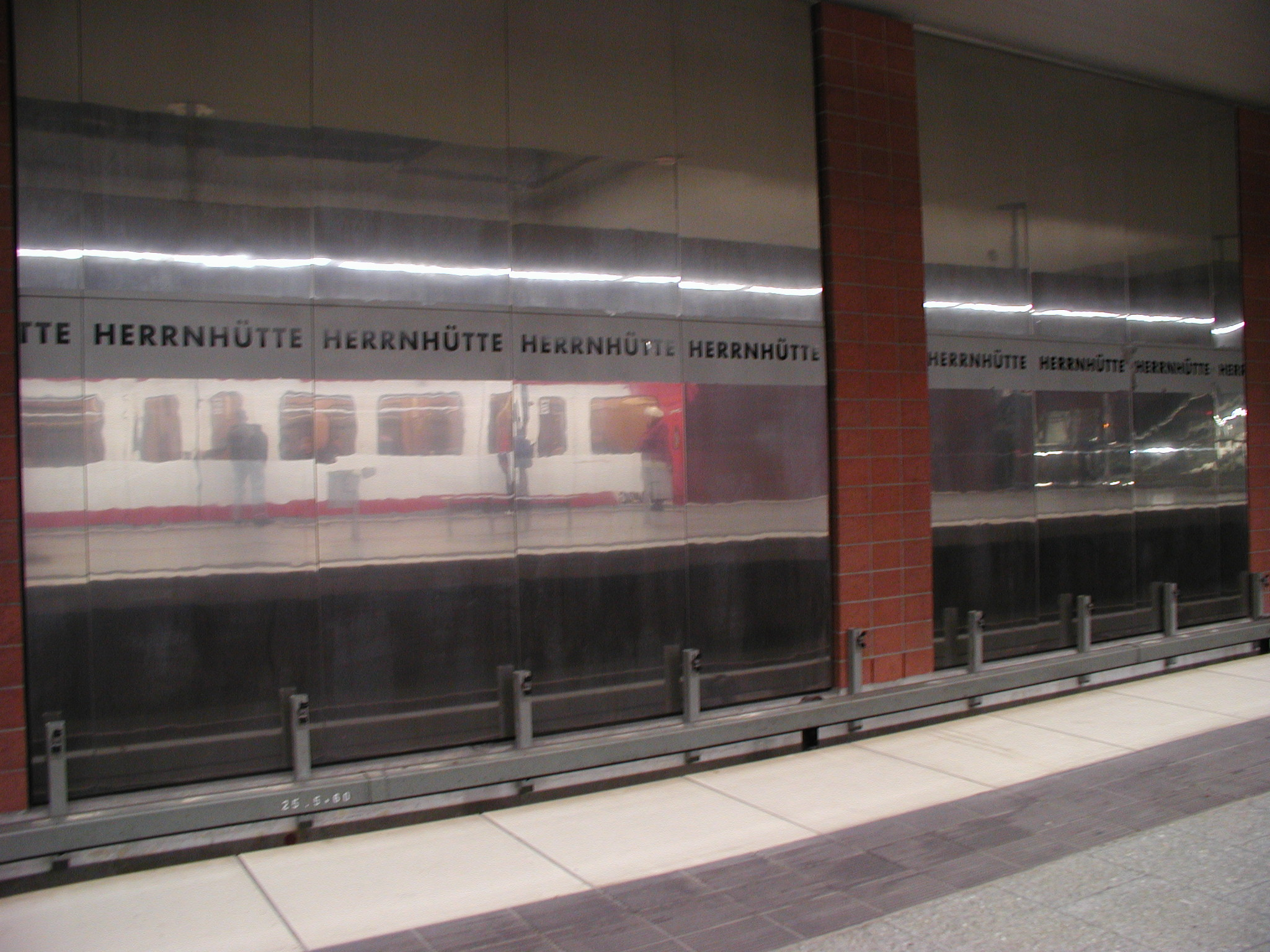

General information
- Location: Äußere Bayreuther Str. 90411 Nürnberg, Germany
- Coordinates: 49.4782334°N 11.1095599°E
- System: Nuremberg U-Bahn station
- Operator: Verkehrs-Aktiengesellschaft Nürnberg
- Connections: Bus: 22 Thon - Herrnhütte; 23 Herrnhütte - Sieboldstraße Schleife; 212 Nürnberg - Gräfenberg

Construction
- Structure type: Underground

Other information
- Fare zone: VGN: 200

History
- Opened: 27 January 1996

Services
Preceding station	Nuremberg U-Bahn	Following station
Nordostbahnhof towards Röthenbach	U2	Ziegelstein towards Flughafen
Location

Herrnhütte station is a Nuremberg U-Bahn station, located on the U2.
