= Hohe Marter station =

Metro station in Nuremberg, Germany

Hohe Marter
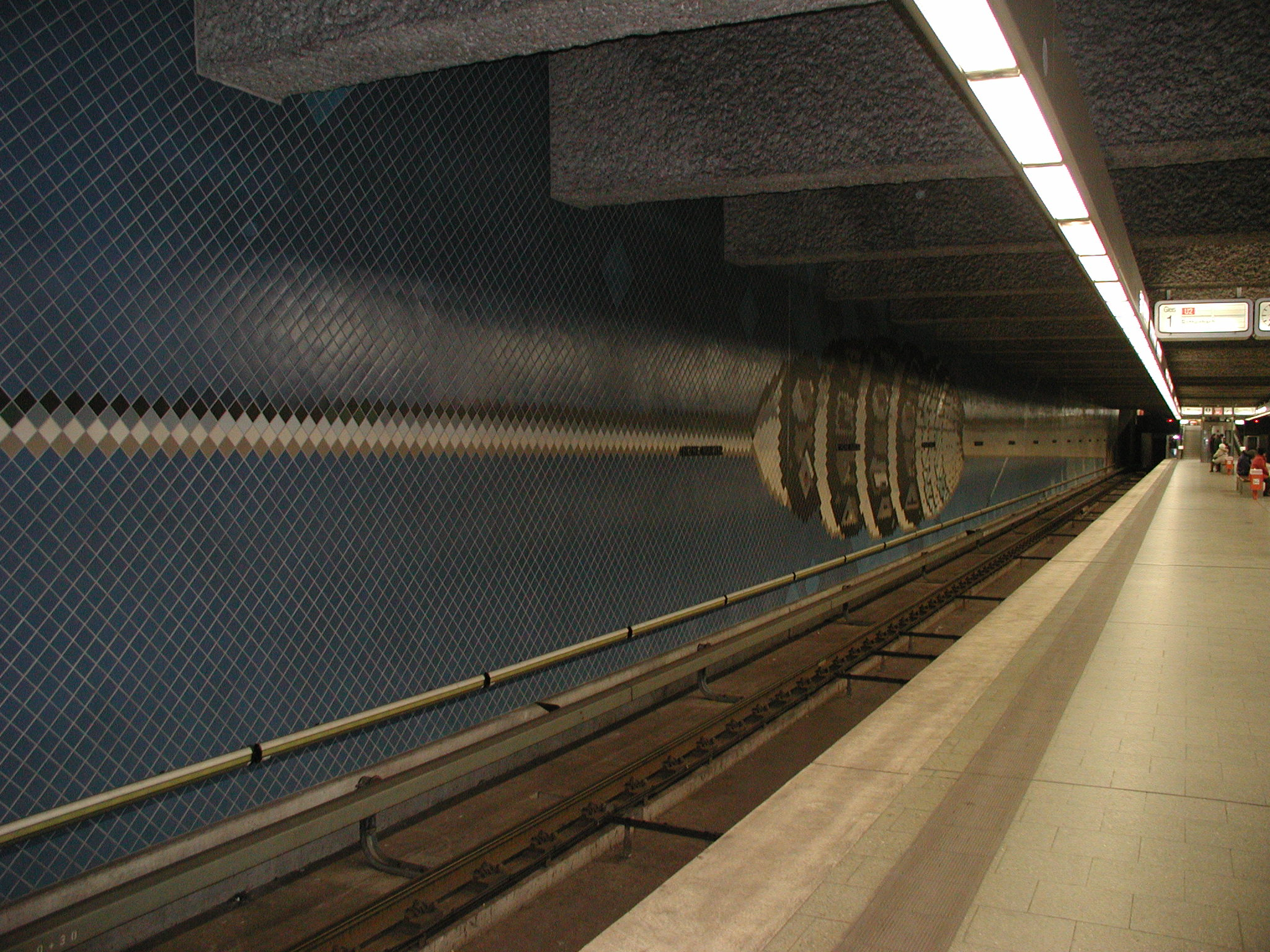

General information
- Location: Schweinauer Hauptstraße; 90441 Nürnberg, Germany
- Coordinates: 49.4287483°N 11.0437671°E
- System: Nuremberg U-Bahn station
- Operator: Verkehrs-Aktiengesellschaft Nürnberg
- Connections: Bus: 35 Röthenbach - Thon; 65 Röthenbach - Röthenbach

Construction
- Structure type: Underground

Other information
- Fare zone: VGN: 100 and 200

History
- Opened: 27 September 1986

Services
| Preceding station | Nuremberg U-Bahn | Following station |
|---|---|---|
| Röthenbach Terminus | U2 | Schweinau towards Flughafen |
Location

Hohe Marter station is a Nuremberg U-Bahn station, located on the line U2.

Opened in 1986, Hohe Marter is a U-Bahn station, designed by the artist Peter Angermann. It has a pixel graphical tile mosaic of the horizontally positioned broadcasting tower on its sides.
