= Bärenschanze station =

Metro station in Nuremberg, Germany

Bärenschanze
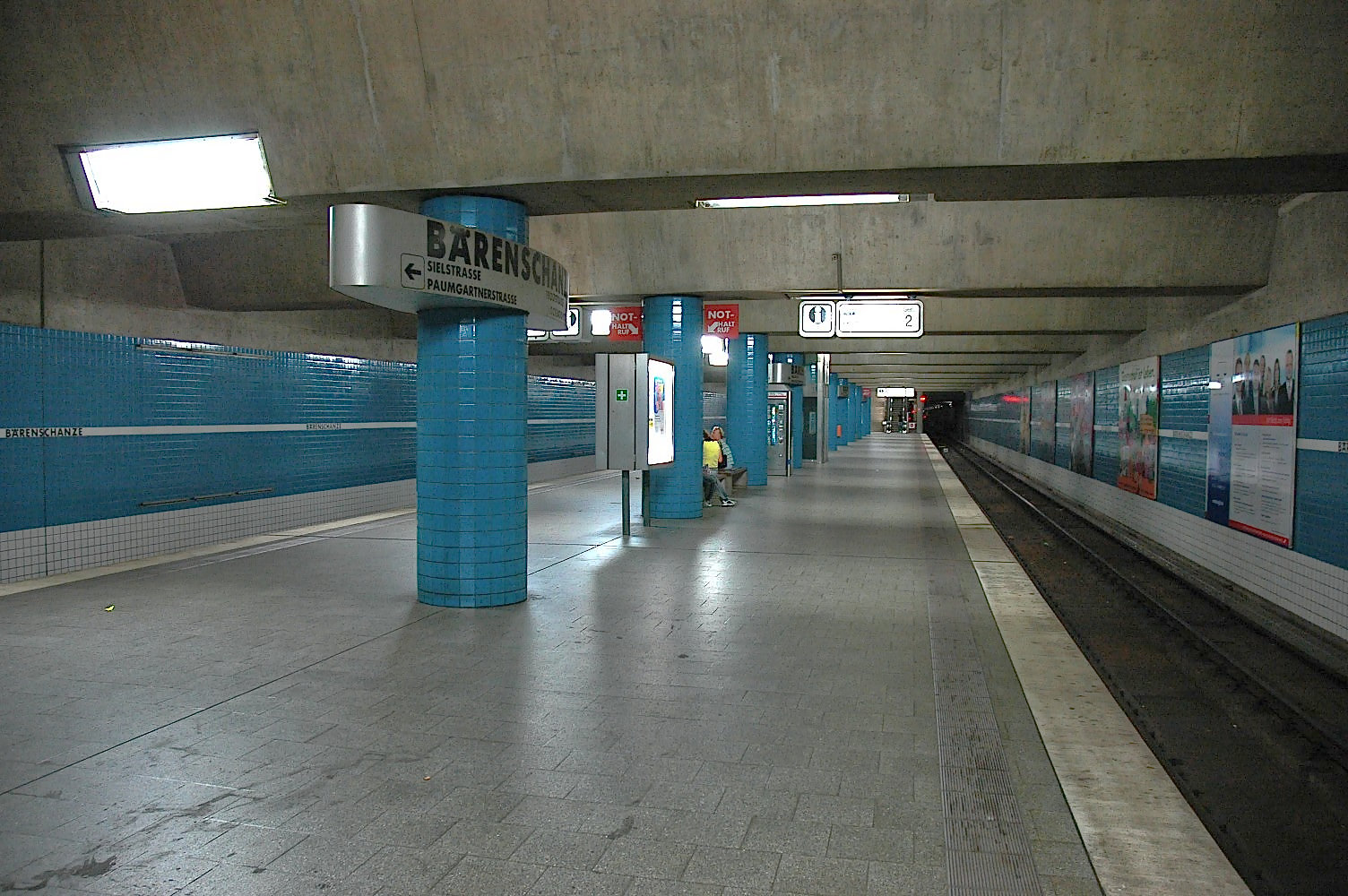

General information
- Location: Fürther Str. 90429 Nürnberg, Germany
- Coordinates: 49.4524618°N 11.0510219°E
- System: Nuremberg U-Bahn station
- Operator: Verkehrs-Aktiengesellschaft Nürnberg

Construction
- Structure type: Underground

Other information
- Fare zone: VGN: 100

History
- Opened: 20 September 1980

Services
Preceding station	Nuremberg U-Bahn	Following station
Maximilianstraße towards Fürth Hardhöhe	U1	Gostenhof towards Langwasser Süd
Location

Bärenschanze station is a Nuremberg U-Bahn station, located on the U1 line.
