= Nürnberg Rothenburgerstraße station =

Railway station in Nuremberg, Germany

Nürnberg Rothenburgerstraße
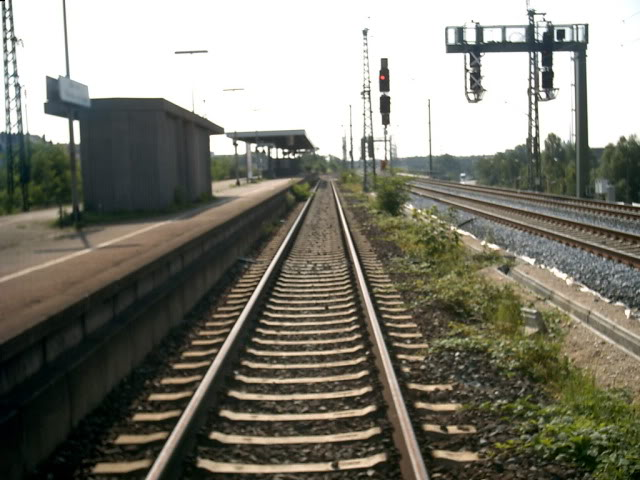
- The station in 2009, prior to rebuilding

General information
- Location: Nuremberg, Bavaria; Germany
- Coordinates: 49°26′43″N 11°03′19″E
- Owner: DB Netz
- Lines: Nuremberg–Bamberg line (KBS 820)
- Distance: 2.3 km (1.4 mi) from Nürnberg Hauptbahnhof
- Platforms: 1 island platform
- Tracks: 1
- Train operators: DB Regio Bayern
- Connections: Nuremberg U-Bahn U2 U3; VGN bus lines

Other information
- Fare zone: 100 (VGN)

Services
Preceding station	Nuremberg S-Bahn	Following station
Fürth Hbf towards Bamberg	S1	Steinbühl towards Neumarkt (Oberpfalz)
Location

Nürnberg Rothenburgerstraße station (German: Bahnhof Nürnberg Rothenburgerstraße), also rendered as Nürnberg Rothenburger Straße, is a railway station in the city of Nuremberg, in Bavaria, Germany. It is located on the standard gauge Nuremberg–Bamberg line of Deutsche Bahn. The station is connected to the Rothenburger Straße station of the Nuremberg U-Bahn.

== Services ==
As of the December 2020 timetable change, the following services stop at Nürnberg Rothenburgerstraße:

- Nuremberg S-Bahn S1: two trains per hour between Bamberg and Hartmannshof.
