= Maxfeld station =

Metro station in Nuremberg, Germany

Maxfeld
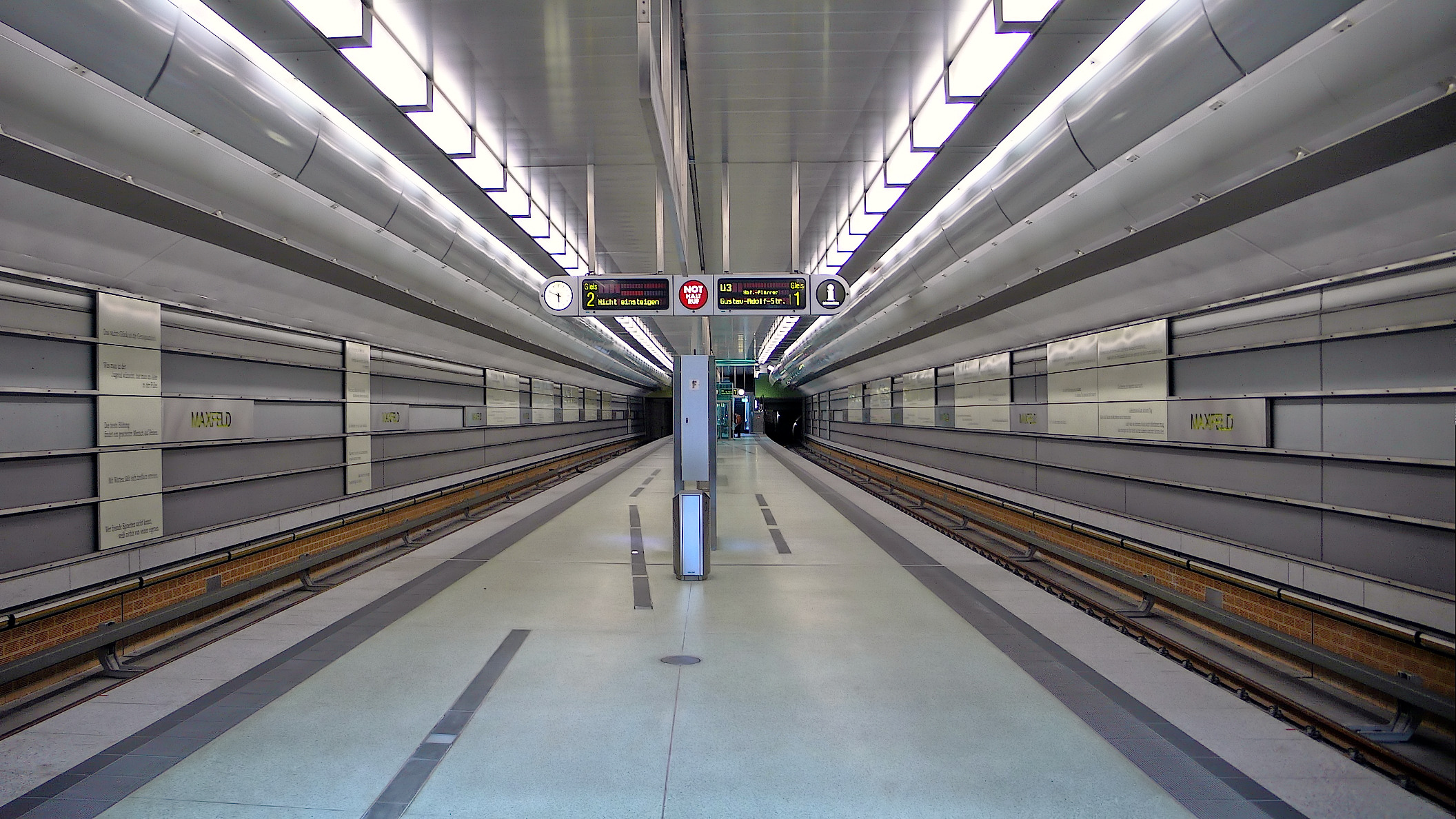

General information
- Location: Goethestraße; 90499 Nürnberg, Germany
- Coordinates: 49.4633888°N 11.0851996°E
- System: Nuremberg U-Bahn station
- Operator: Verkehrs-Aktiengesellschaft Nürnberg
- Connections: Bus: 46 Hl.-Geist-Spital - Martha-Maria-Krkhs; 47 Hl.-Geist-Spital - Forchheimer Str.; 37 Hl.-Geist-Spital - Fürth Hauptbahnhof

Construction
- Structure type: Underground

Other information
- Fare zone: VGN: 100

History
- Opened: 14 June 2008

Services
Preceding station	Nuremberg U-Bahn	Following station
Rathenauplatz towards Großreuth bei Schweinau	U3	Kaulbachplatz towards Nordwestring
Location

Maxfeld station is a Nuremberg U-Bahn station, located on the U3.
