= Gustav-Adolf-Straße station =

Metro station in Nuremberg, Germany

Gustav-Adolf-Straße
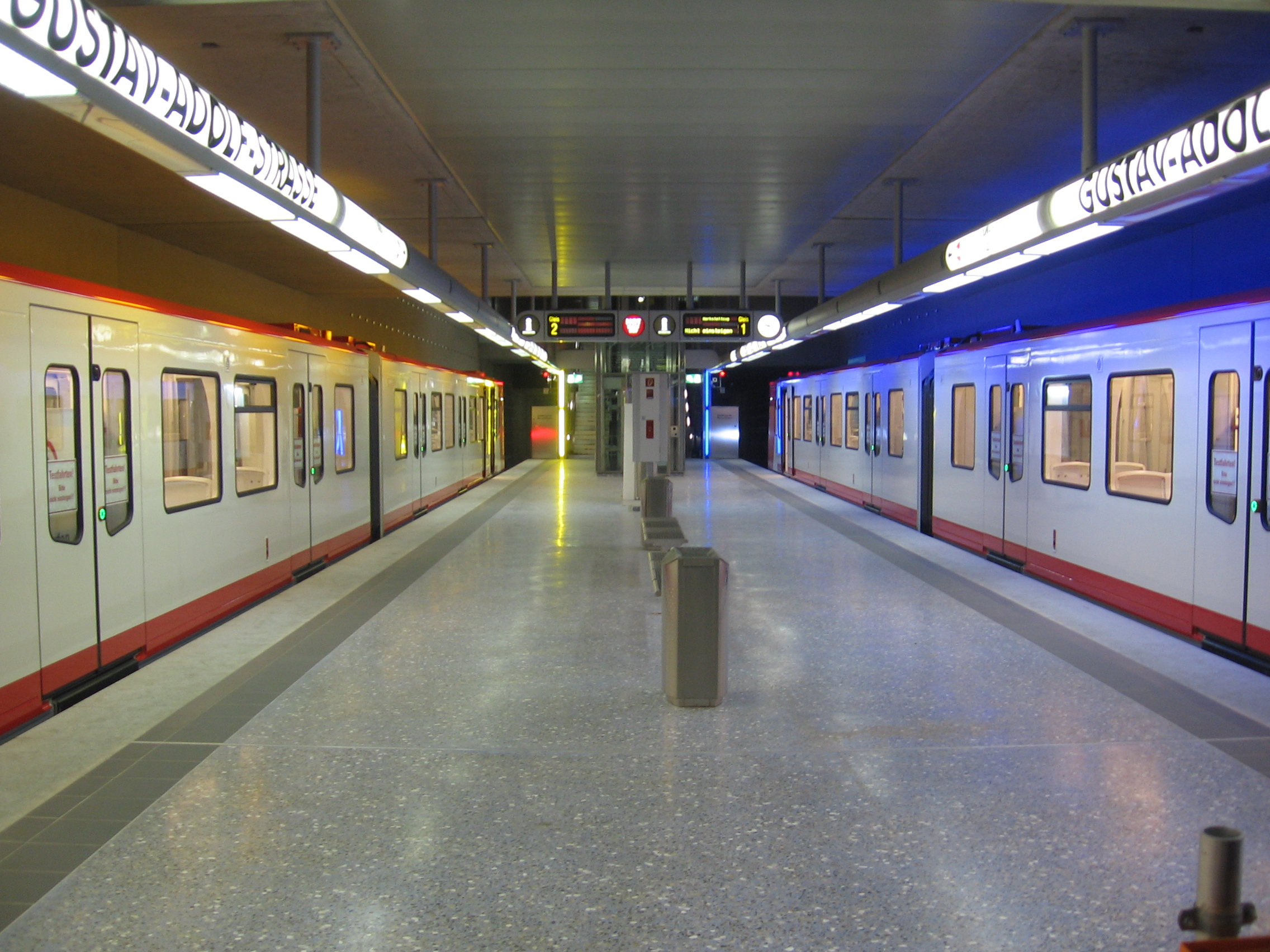

General information
- Location: Gustav-Adolf-Straße; 90439 Nürnberg, Germany
- Coordinates: 49.4390413°N 11.0372095°E
- System: Nuremberg U-Bahn station
- Operator: Verkehrs-Aktiengesellschaft Nürnberg
- Connections: Bus: 35 Röthenbach - Thon; 39 Gustav-Adolf-Straße - Maximilianstraße; 68 Gustav-Adolf-Straße - Langwasser Mitte; 69 Gustav-Adolf-Straße - Röthenbach; 70 Gustav-Adolf-Straße - Zirndorf Kneippallee; 71 Gustav-Adolf-Straße - Oberasbach Linder Siedlung; 72 Gustav-Adolf-Straße - Zirndorf Realschule

Construction
- Structure type: Underground

Other information
- Fare zone: VGN: 100

History
- Opened: 14 June 2008

Services
Preceding station	Nuremberg U-Bahn	Following station
Großreuth bei Schweinau Terminus	U3	Sündersbühl towards Nordwestring
Location

Gustav-Adolf-Straße station is a Nuremberg U-Bahn station, located on the U3. The station is named for the Swedish king Gustavus Adolphus.
