= Gostenhof station =

Metro station in Nuremberg, Germany

Gostenhof
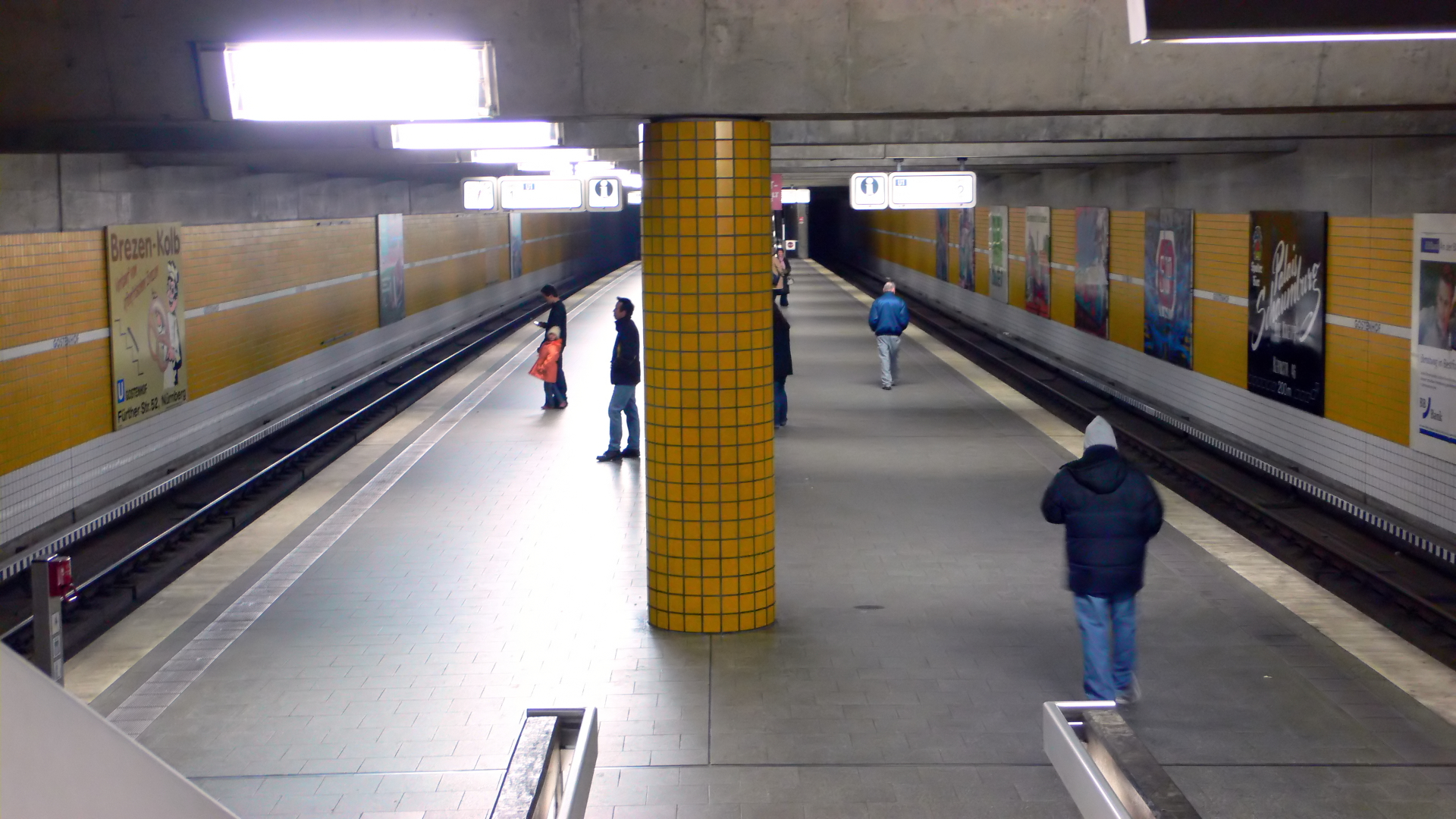

General information
- Location: Fürther Str. 90429 Nürnberg, Germany
- Coordinates: 49.4505827°N 11.05694°E
- System: Nuremberg U-Bahn station
- Operator: Verkehrs-Aktiengesellschaft Nürnberg
- Connections: Bus: 34 Plärrer - Thon

Construction
- Structure type: Underground

Other information
- Fare zone: VGN: 100

History
- Opened: 20 September 1980

Services
Preceding station	Nuremberg U-Bahn	Following station
Bärenschanze towards Fürth Hardhöhe	U1	Plärrer towards Langwasser Süd
Location

Gostenhof station is a Nuremberg U-Bahn train station, in Nuremberg, Germany. It is located on the U1 line.
