= Rennweg =

Rennweg is the name of:

- Rennweg (Zürich)
- Rennweg am Katschberg
- Neuhaus am Rennweg

== Railway stations ==
- Rennweg station (Nuremberg U-Bahn), an underground railway station in Nuremberg, Germany
- Wien Rennweg railway station, a railway station in Vienna, Austria
