= U2 (Nuremberg U-Bahn) =

Underground railway line in Nuremberg, Germany

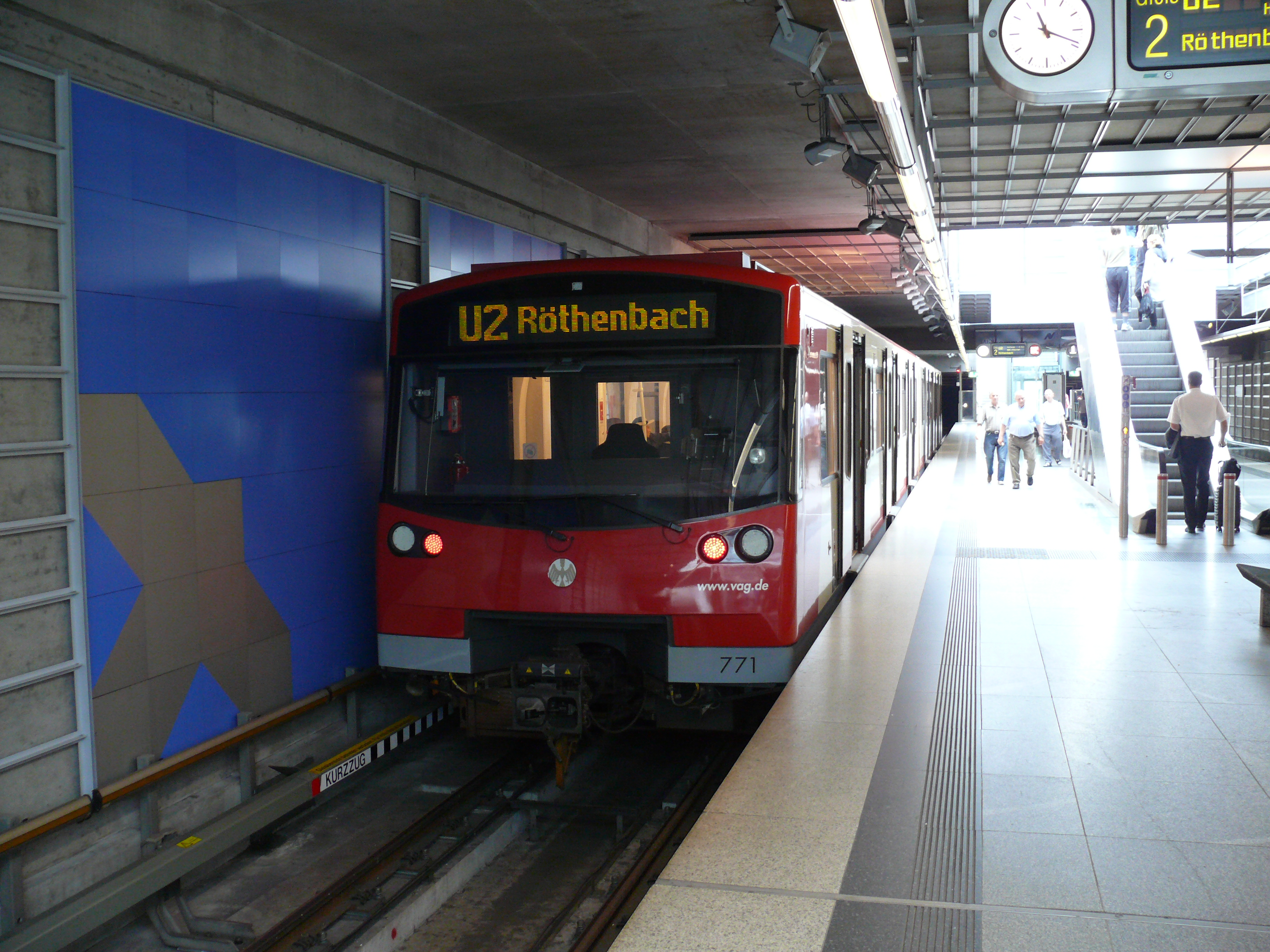

Overview
- Stations: 16

Service
- Type: Rapid transit
- System: Nuremberg U-Bahn
- Operator: Verkehrs-Aktiengesellschaft Nürnberg
- Rolling stock: MVG Class A (until 2010); VAG Class DT1 (until 2010); VAG Class DT2 (until 2010); VAG Class DT3 (since 2008)

History
- Opened: 28 January 1984; 42 years ago
- Completed: 27 November 1999
- Opening of U3 - begin of automatic operation on U2 tracks: 14 June 2008
- Conversion to fully automated operation completed: 2 January 2010

Technical
- Line length: 13.2 km (8.2 mi)
- Number of tracks: Double track except between Ziegelstein station and Flughafen station where a single track stretch exists
- Track gauge: 1,435 mm (4 ft 8 1/2 in) standard gauge
- Electrification: 750 V DC third rail

The U2 is an underground line in Nuremberg, opened on 28 January 1984 and the last station along the line to open was Flughafen (Airport) in 1999. The line is about 13.1 kilometres (8.1 mi) long and has 16 stations; the termini are Röthenbach and Flughafen. Since 2010 all trains in regular operations have been run driverless. At 2,388 metres (7,835 ft) the stretch between Ziegelstein station and Flughafen station is the longest interval between two stations in the network and the only single track section on any subway line in Germany (both stations have two platform tracks, but the track between the two is a single track without passing loops).

== Overview ==
In the following, the direction is from southwest to northwest in line with the direction in which the line was built.

The route begins in the southwest of Nuremberg at Röthenbach station, at the western end of a three-track parking and turning system, and continues east along the Schweinauer Hauptstraße under the Main-Danube Canal and the de:Südwesttangente highway (southwestern tangential road) to the station Hohe Marter. This station is the longest in the Nuremberg subway network with 268 metres (879 ft) and replaces the two abandoned tram stops Friesenstraße and Schweinau, which were formerly located at the two present-day subway exits.

The route continues under Schweinauer Hauptstraße to Schweinau station and St. Leonhard station, which, due to its location in the middle of Schweinauer Straße, is completely elastic so as not to give off the vibrations caused by driving to the surrounding houses. Next is the Rothenburger Straße station beneath the Frankenschnellweg (A73). Rothenburger Straße station marks the beginning of the shared trunk line between U2 and U3 and is also served by S1 of the Nuremberg S-Bahn. Consequently, a lot of interchanging traffic uses this station. The last part of the southern half of the route runs in a curve under the Obere Kanalstraße and then leads in a right arc to the Plärrer station, where the U2 meets the U1. The Plärrer is an old interchange point for all kinds of transportation and was served by Germany's first railway and at times over a dozen tram lines. As of 2024 it is served by all Nuremberg subway lines and three (out of seven) Nuremberg tram lines.

After the station Plärrer the route runs under the Frauentorgraben to Opernhaus station. During the construction of this station which is close to the former city wall, the former moat which had been filled in was restored and thus the station has open air access and natural light to one side. The former moat has been pedestrianized. The route continues to Nuremberg Hauptbahnhof, serving the other main interchange point (all subway lines; 3 out of 5 tram lines) in the network besides Plärrer. Afterwards the line heads north to the Wöhrder Wiese station. Due to its location in the valley of the river Pegnitz, the station had to be lowered and the northern branch of the Pegnitz had to be incorporated into the station building, which can be seen in the relatively low ceiling, which extends across the entire station. The following route runs under the Laufertorgraben and steeply climbs towards Rathenauplatz station, which can be observed in the station itself, as the ceiling from the southern to the northern platform has a significant difference in height. Rathenauplatz station named for the slain politician and industrialist Walther Rathenau is the last station U2 shares with U3 and also allows interchange with tram line 8, making it one of the busiest stations in the network.

After the Rathenauplatz station, the route initially runs under the Bayreuther Straße, turns right to the Rennweg station under the street of the same name and continues under Schoppershofstraße to the Schoppershof station. Between this and the following station Nordostbahnhof under the Leipziger Platz the two tracks run together in the same single bore tunnel. This is opposed to most of the rest of the line where the two tracks run in separate tunnels. Nordostbahnhof is also served by the Nürnberg-Gräfenberg mainline railway and the U2 serves as a connection for mainline rail passengers between this line and the rest of the network as there is no revenue service from Nordostbahnhof to stations on any other mainline railway.

There is a parking and turning system under the Bessemerstraße in a tube shared with the city-side track. After that the station Herrnhütte station is found at the junction with the Äußere Bayreuther Straße. Then the route takes a narrow counter arc under housing development to the station Ziegelstein beneath Fritz Munkert Platz, at whose northern end is another parking and turning system. The two railway tracks are then merged and run as a single-track tunnel in a westerly direction to the terminus station serving the airport. Due to the long single track section between Ziegelstein and Airport, only one train every ten minutes continues to the airport with most trains during the day terminating at Ziegelstein. This was formerly indicated by short terminating trains being indicated as "U21". The station serving the airport has two platform tracks but usually only one is used for passenger service. Occasionally a train with minor defects or awaiting a later departure will wait on the mostly unused second platform track.

== Stations ==
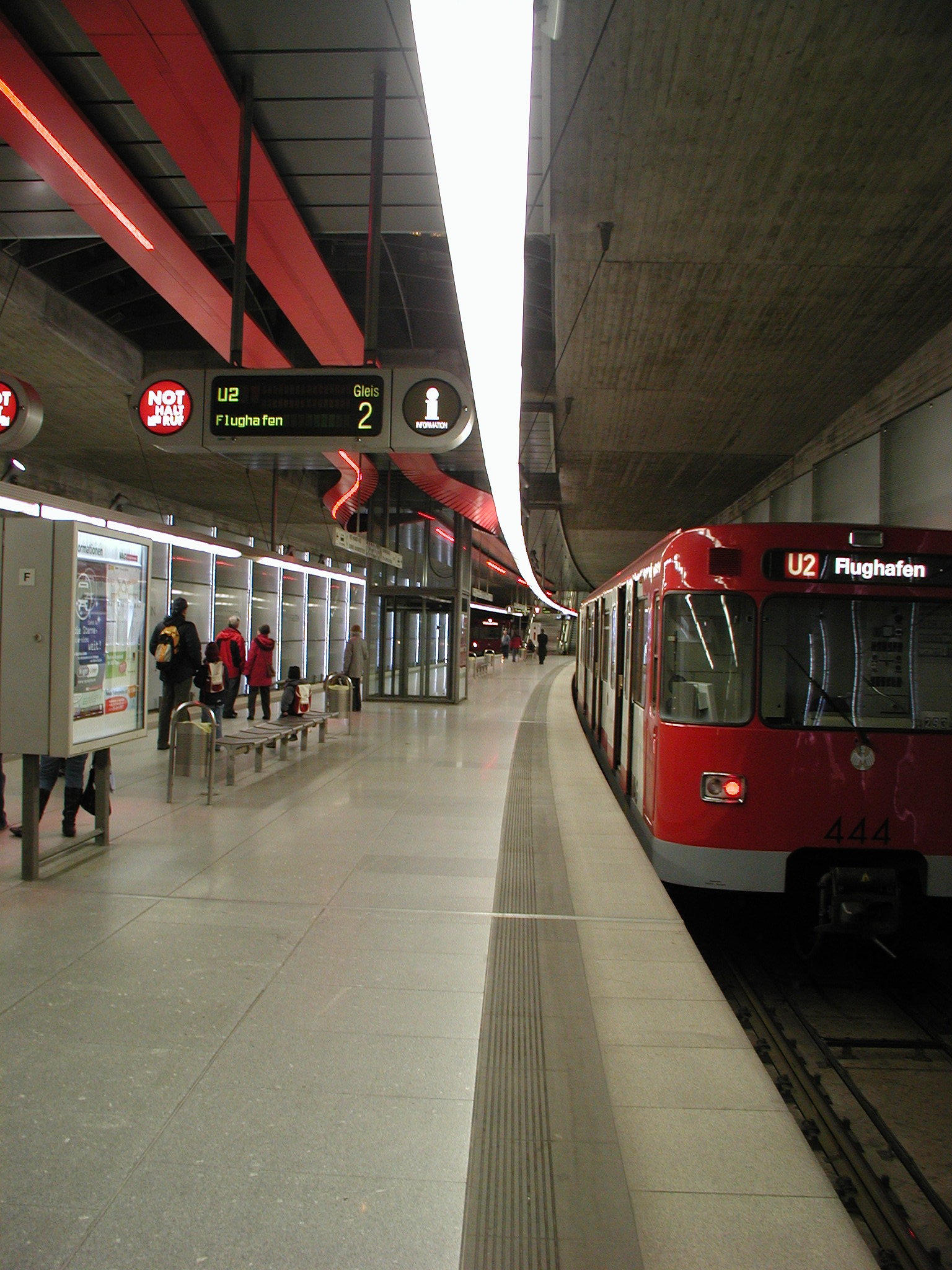
A train in the station Ziegelstein

Stations	Transfers
U2
Röthenbach	Bus
Hohe Marter	Bus
Schweinau	Bus
Sankt Leonhard	
Rothenburger Straße	U3 S1
Plärrer	U1 U3 Nuremberg tramway Bus
Opernhaus	U3
Hauptbahnhof	U1 U3 S1 S2 S3 S4 S5 S6 R-Bahn Deutsche Bahn Nuremberg tramway Bus
Wöhrder Wiese	U3 Nuremberg tramway
Rathenauplatz	U3 Nuremberg tramway Bus
Rennweg	
Schoppershof	Bus
Nordostbahnhof	Bus
Herrnhütte	Bus
Ziegelstein	Bus
Marienberg	planned
Flughafen	Bus

== History ==
=== Opening Dates and Costs ===
Logo U2

Opened Segment	Number of Stations	length	cost (nominal)	date opened	cost (inflation adjusted)	cost per km (inflation adjusted)
Plärrer ↔ Schweinau	3*	2,400 metres (7,900 ft)	163 million DM	28 January 1984	160,121,194€	66,717,164€
Schweinau ↔ Röthenbach	2	1,785 metres (5,856 ft)	120 million DM	27 September 1986	112,750,485€	63,165,537€
Plärrer ↔ Hauptbahnhof	2	1,295 metres (4,249 ft)	120 million DM	23 September 1988	112,638,055€	86,979,193€
Hauptbahnhof ↔ Rathenauplatz	2	1,292 metres (4,239 ft)	125 million DM	24 September 1990	112,782,110€	87,292,655€
Rathenauplatz ↔ Schoppershof	2	1,291 metres (4,236 ft)	108 million DM	29 September 1993	87,141,542€	67,499,258€
Schoppershof ↔ Herrnhütte	2	1,703 metres (5,587 ft)	173 million DM	27 January 1996	127,889,824€	75,096,784€
Herrnhütte ↔ Flughafen	2	3,332 metres (10,932 ft)	180 million DM	27 November 1999	127,380,520€	38,229,447€
Σ	16	13,089 metres (42,943 ft)	989 million DM	1984-1999	840,703,730€	64,229,791€

* Large parts of the infrastructure for U2 at Plärrer station (including 400 metres (1,300 ft) of tracks and tunnel) was alrerady constructed when U1 was built; therefore those portions are not counted in this list

=== Later phases of construction and conversion to automatic operation ===
As the construction of U2 neared its end, debates intensified about whether to expand the U-Bahn network further – and if so where – and what to do about the tramway network. At the time of the decision to build the subway, it was planned to shut down the tramway as U-Bahn lines were opened. Initially this was largely uncontroversial, but as tram stations were being shut down years ahead of subway construction – or even without any subway station anywhere nearby even planned – discontent started to rise. Furthermore, the municipal finances, which had been healthy in the 1960s when the decision to build the subway was taken, were becoming increasingly strained and thus a fully fledged three- or even four-line network seemed to be decades away if it was ever going to happen. In consequence this would mean that subway extension beyond a certain point would almost certainly "shrink" the tram system to an unsustainable size but connecting every neighborhood that had heretofore had tram service to the U-Bahn seemed out of the question as well.

Furthermore the SPD who had held the mayorality since free elections resumed after World War II (with the exception of former SPD mayor Uhrschlechter running as an independent for a few years) lost the 1996 mayoral election, putting a CSU candidate into that office for the first time in history. With political winds now changed, a compromise decision had to be found and the aforementioned budget crunch had to be taken into account. The U2 was finished with a connection to the airport (then slowly but surely coming into its own as a hub for Air Berlin's winter season touristic operations), but to cut costs it was built single track only. Furthermore, the airport (owned half by the city and half by the state of Bavaria) took over part of the cost of the subway extension serving it. It was then decided that a new subway line was going to be built, but the tram network would be kept as well. To reduce costs and to show off Nuremberg's still existing industrial capabilities, it was decided to run automated trains on the new line which was to share part of its tracks with the existing U2.

However, by the time this decision was put into practice, the political winds had turned again and Ulrich Maly retook the mayorality for the SPD once more after a single 6 year term by Ludwig Scholz of the CSU. The new U3 was initially planned to open in time for the 2006 FIFA World Cup which had games played in Nuremberg. However, technological issues with the new system and the desire to work out all kinks delayed opening to 2008. Operations on U2 were never shut down and for almost two years driver operated trains ran in mixed operations with fully automated trains on the sections of U2 shared with U3. By late 2009 confidence in the new system was large enough that full automatization of U2 was decided upon and since 2 January 2010 (the day after New Year's Day) all trains in revenue service on U2 have been fully automated. This represents the first existing rapid transit line in the world to be converted from fully manual operation to fully automated operation. However, the system has not attracted as many customers outside Nuremberg as had been hoped for when the decision to automate the line was taken.

=== Costs ===
The entire line cost - in then nominal terms - a total of 960 million Deutsche Mark to build, of which 716 million (roughly three quarters) were provided by the federal and state government. The rest was mostly paid for by the city of Nuremberg, with the exception of the extension to the airport for which the airport provided 18.6 million DM of the 180 million DM cost (a further 15 million DM was paid for by the city of Nuremberg).

== Operations ==
During the rush hour peak trains leave every 3 1/3 minutes (200 seconds) overlapping with U3 to a 100 second headway between Rothenburger Straße and Rathenauplatz. As the section of track between Airport and Ziegelstein is single track, only one train every ten minutes serves the airport with most other trains terminating early at Ziegelstein.

== Planned extensions ==
=== Southern end ===
As early as the first U-Bahn plans which formed the basis for the decision to build an U-Bahn, an extension towards Stein was proposed. However, the problem with such an extension is the municipal border involved and local politicians in Stein have been reluctant to assume the financial burden of construction and especially the long term burden of maintenance and operation. Another problem is the de:Gemeindeverkehrsfinanzierungsgesetz (municipal traffic financing law or GVFG) which regulates which construction projects get federal and state funding and mandates a so-called "Benefit-Cost Quotient" above 1.0 (i.e. "benefits" exceeding "costs") and an extension to Stein is unlikely to meet that as only the newly built stretch would be taken under consideration.

=== Northern end ===
Another extension variously suggested since the extension of tram line 4 northwards to "am Wegfeld", a point due West of the current endpoint of U2 at the airport, was politically decided, is towards the tram/bus interchange point "am Wegfeld" in the de:Knoblauchsland. While various studies have failed to reach the required benefit cost ratio above 1, the current bus service between the airport and "am Wegfeld" (line 33 with onward service to Fürth Hauptbahnhof and line 30 with onward service to Erlangen) overlaps to a 10 minute headway, the same as U2 service between the airport and Ziegelstein station. In addition to linking the airport to the interchange point and relieving the residential areas of bus traffic, such an extension would also offer an interchange between tram line 4 (which is planned to be extended towards Erlangen in the course of the "Stadt-Umland Bahn" project) and U2 (otherwise only possible at Plärrer station) and relieve the airport of the role as a bus/subway interchange point, that it only gained in the course of the reorganization of bus traffic in the north of Nuremberg in the course of the opening of the tram extension to "am Wegfeld" in 2016.

=== Branches or infill stations ===
There are also various plans for branches and an additional infill station on the last stretch towards the airport. Including a proposed "Marienberg" station which was already indicated as a possibility in promotional material released during the opening of the extension towards the airport.

== Rolling stock ==
Prior to the introduction of automatic operation in the course of the opening of U3 (2008) and the conversion of U2 to all automatic operation (2010), the line was served by the same VAG Class DT1, VAG Class DT2 and even MVG Class A vehicles as U1. However, with the conversion of U2 to automatic operation, those vehicles were withdrawn from service or switched to exclusively operating on U1, the last remaining all manual line. Some older units of Class DT1 still contain displays in their interior that can be switched between "U1", "U2" and the obsolete "U11" and "U21" (since abandoned designations for truncated runs on the U1 or U2 corridor), but they haven't served any purpose since the permanent switch of those vehicles to U1 service and the subsequent abandonment of the "U11" designation.

As of 2022 only VAG Class DT3 (both with and without a driver's cabin) serve on U2, just as they do on U3. The VAG Class G1 is capable of both automatic and manual operation and could in the future be used on U2 as well.

== See also ==
- Nuremberg U-Bahn
  - U1 (Nuremberg U-Bahn)
  - U3 (Nuremberg U-Bahn)
- Nuremberg S-Bahn
  - S1 (Nuremberg)
  - S2 (Nuremberg)
  - S3 (Nuremberg)
  - S4 (Nuremberg)
  - S5 (Nuremberg)
