= List of Nuremberg U-Bahn stations =

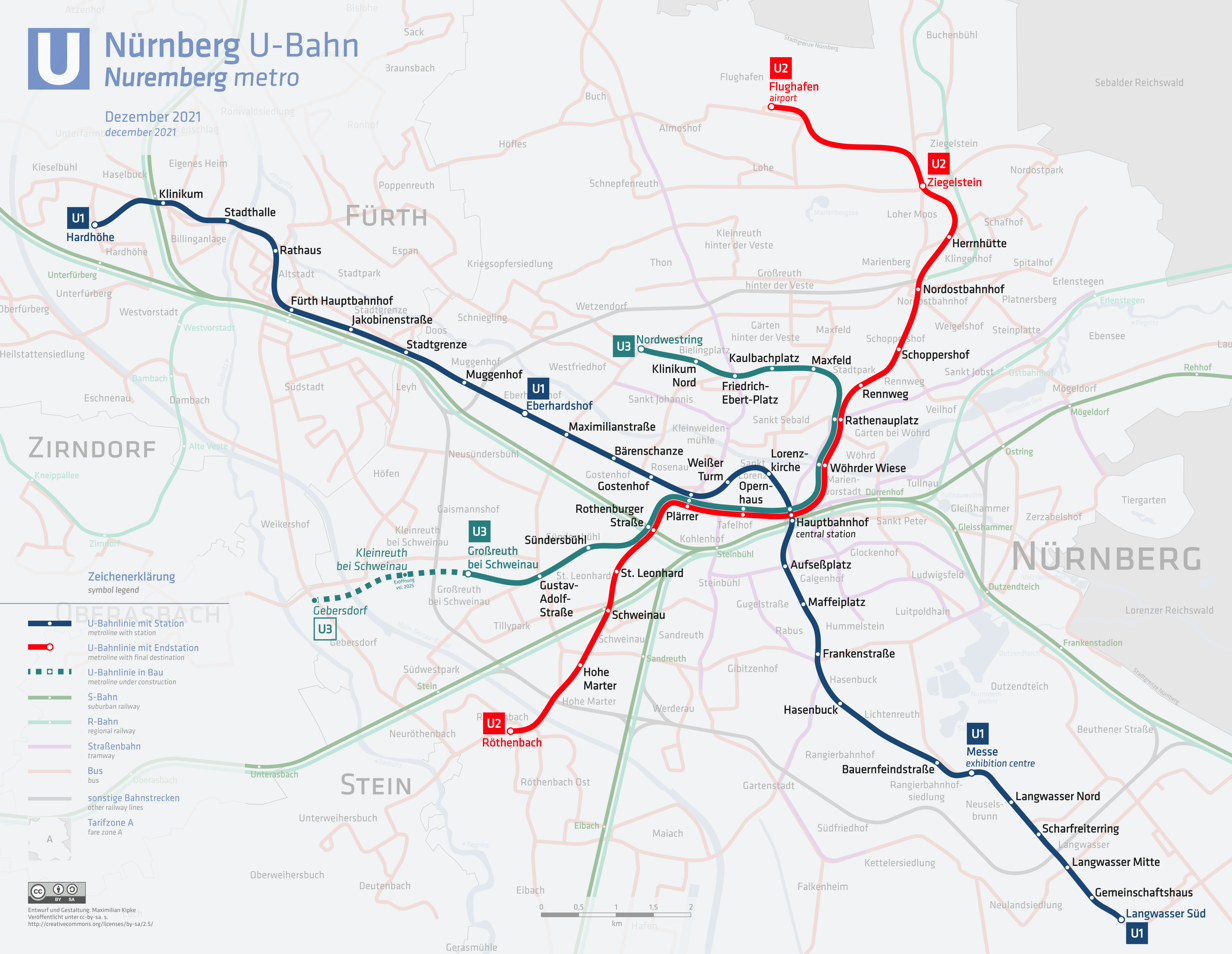
Line map

The following is the list of 49 stations on the Nuremberg U-Bahn:

Station	Line	Opened	Notes
Aufseßplatz	U1	23 September 1975	Terminus of U1 1975–1978
Bärenschanze	U1	20 September 1980	Terminus of U1 1980–1981
Bauernfeindstraße	U1	1 March 1972	Terminus of U1 1972–1974
Eberhardshof	U1	20 June 1981	Terminus of U1 1981–1982
Flughafen	U2	27 November 1999	Terminus of U2
Frankenstraße	U1	18 June 1974	Terminus of U1 1974–1975
Friedrich-Ebert-Platz	U3	11 December 2011	Terminus of U3 2011–2017
Fürth Hauptbahnhof	U1	7 December 1985	Terminus of U1 1985–1998
Gemeinschaftshaus	U1	1 March 1972
Gostenhof	U1	20 September 1980
Großreuth	U3	15 October 2020	Terminus of U3
Gustav-Adolf-Straße	U3	14 June 2008	Terminus of U3 2008–2020
Hasenbuck	U1	18 June 1974
Hauptbahnhof	U1, U2, U3	28 January 1978, 24 September 1988	U3 service since 14 June 2008 Terminus of U2 1988–1990
Hardhöhe	U1	8 December 2007	Terminus of U1
Herrnhütte	U2	27 January 1996	Terminus of U2 1996–1999
Hohe Marter	U2	27 September 1986
Jakobinenstraße	U1	20 March 1982	Terminus of U1 1982–1985
Kaulbachplatz	U3	11 December 2011
Klinikum	U1	4 December 2004	Terminus of U1 2004–2007
Klinikum Nord	U3	22 May 2017
Langwasser Mitte	U1	1 March 1972
Langwasser Nord	U1	1 March 1972
Langwasser Süd	U1	1 March 1972	Terminus of U1
Lorenzkirche	U1	28 January 1978
Maffeiplatz	U1	23 September 1975
Maxfeld	U3	14 June 2008	Terminus of U3 2008–2011
Maximilianstraße	U1	20 June 1981
Messe	U1	1 March 1972
Muggenhof	U1	20 March 1982
Nordostbahnhof	U2	27 January 1996
Nordwestring	U3	22 May 2017	Terminus of U3
Opernhaus	U2, U3	24 September 1988	U3 service since 14 June 2008
Plärrer	U1, U2, U3	20 September 1980	U3 service since 14 June 2008 Terminus of U2 1984–1988
Rathaus Fürth	U1	5 December 1998
Rathenauplatz	U2	29 September 1990	U3 service since 14 June 2008 Terminus of U2 1990–1993
Rennweg	U2	22 May 1993
Röthenbach	U2	27 September 1986	Terminus of U2
Rothenburger Straße	U2, U3	28 January 1984	U3 service since 14 June 2008
Scharfreiterring	U1	1 March 1972
Schoppershof	U2	22 May 1993	Terminus of U2 1993–1996
Schweinau	U2	28 January 1984	Terminus of U2 1984–1986
St. Leonhard	U2	28 January 1984
Stadtgrenze	U1	20 March 1982
Stadthalle	U1	5 December 1998	Terminus of U1 1998–2004
Sündersbühl	U3	14 June 2008
Weißer Turm	U1	28 January 1978	Terminus of U1 1978–1980
Wöhrder Wiese	U2, U3	29 September 1990	U3 service since 14 June 2008
Ziegelstein	U2	27 November 1999
