= Flughafen station =

Metro station in Nuremberg, Germany

Flughafen
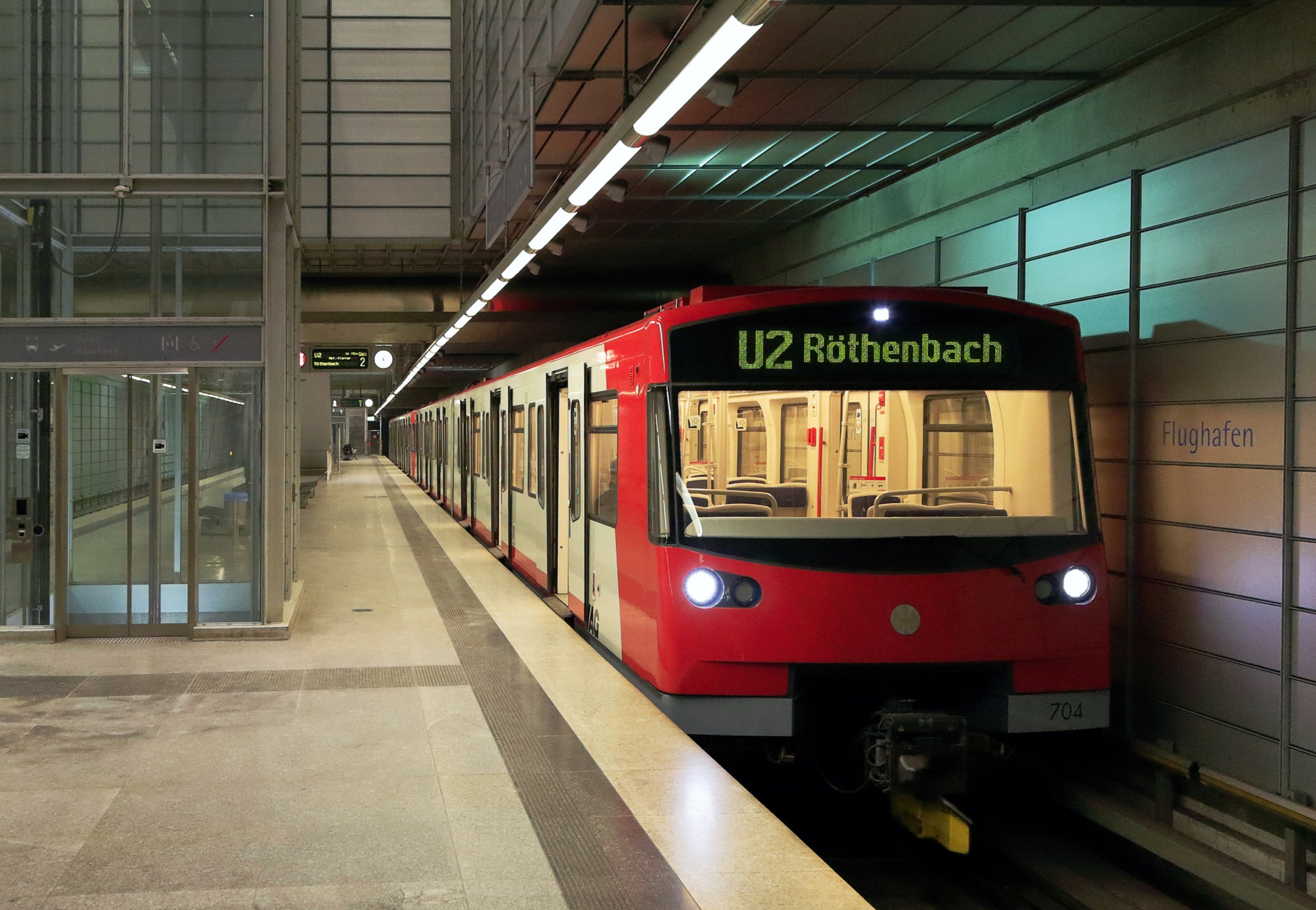

General information
- Location: Nuremberg Airport, Flughafenstraße; 90411 Nürnberg, Germany
- Coordinates: 49.494°N 11.078°E
- System: Nuremberg U-Bahn station
- Operator: Verkehrs-Aktiengesellschaft Nürnberg
- Connections: Bus: 30 Nürnberg Nordostbahnhof - Airport - Am Wegfeld (connection to Tram) - Erlangen Süd - Hugenottenplatz; 33 Nürnberg Flughafen - Fürth Rathaus

Construction
- Structure type: Underground

Other information
- Fare zone: VGN: 200

History
- Opened: 27 November 1999

Services
Preceding station	Nuremberg U-Bahn	Following station
Ziegelstein towards Röthenbach	U2	Terminus
Location

Flughafen station is a Nuremberg U-Bahn station, located on the U2, serving Nuremberg Airport. Since 2008 when Berlin Tempelhof Airport shut down, Nuremberg has been the only city in Germany whose airport is connected to the subway network. (Note: Stuttgart Airport which was connected to Stuttgart Stadtbahn in 2021 is connected to a Stadtbahn rather than a subway system)

Located 7 km (5 miles) north of central Nuremberg, the U2 transports passengers to/from Nürnberg Hauptbahnhof within 12 minutes. Besides serving the airport, the station is also an interchange point for buses with line 30 going on to Erlangen, serving the technological faculty of the University of Erlangen–Nuremberg and line 33 serving Fürth main station. Both those lines serve the tram interchange point "am Wegfeld" along line 4.

== Infrastructure ==
The station is just in front of the terminal building of Nuremberg airport with two elevators and three escalators providing easy access. It is closer to the entrance than any of the parking lots. There is a bus stop to the south of the station served by bus lines 30 and 33 during the day as well as the night bus line N12 (Flughafen-Hauptbahnhof) operating on nights before public holidays and nights from Friday to Saturday as well as Saturday to Sunday. In the case of construction or other shutdown rail replacement bus service is also offered from the aforementioned bus stop. The subway station has two tracks, but in normal operations only the northern track is used for passenger service.

Construction of the extension from Herrnhütte started in September of 1996 and cost 180 million Deutsche Mark (equivalent to €133,064,557 in 2021) of which the airport paid 18.6 million and the municipal government of Nuremberg 15 million with the rest being paid by the federal and state government.

== Operations ==
Due to cost-cutting measures, the stretch of track between Ziegelstein station and the airport is single track. It is also the longest stretch of track between any two stations in the Nuremberg U-Bahn network. As trains take roughly three minutes to traverse the single track section and there are no passing loops, capacity is limited to a maximum of roughly one train per direction every six minutes. In practice, trains to the airport leave at a ten minute headway to provide a clockface schedule. Until 2017, trains on U2 terminating short of the final destination were instead designated "U21" (but only when going northbound as the difference didn't matter for passengers going the other way) to reduce potential confusion. Since then trains have simply been labeled "U2 towards Ziegelstein" or similar such designations. After serving the airport, trains "reverse out" for their trip back towards Röthenbach station.

== Station design and artwork ==
Given that the airport is of particular interest to international visitors, it is the only station whose name appears in German and English on signage inside the station. Announcements are also made in German as well as English onboard trains and inside the station, but this is also true for the automated announcements at Hauptbahnhof ("main railway station") and informing passengers of the interchange possibility between U3 and U2 at Rothenburger Straße station and Rathenauplatz station.

After the airport was named after Nuremberg born Renaissance artist Albrecht Dürer, the station walls on the southern wall behind the platform were adorned with reproductions of artwork by him, including the "Rhinocerus" a woodcut of the first such animal to be seen in Europe since Roman times, which Dürer drew based on descriptions and other artwork depicting the animal. A plaque accompanying the artwork details the background of its origins and points out that Dürer apparently mistook skin-folds for armor plates. Other artworks by Dürer displayed in the station are the Young Hare and the self portrait with fur trimmed robe.
