= Röthenbach station =

Metro station in Nuremberg, Germany

Röthenbach
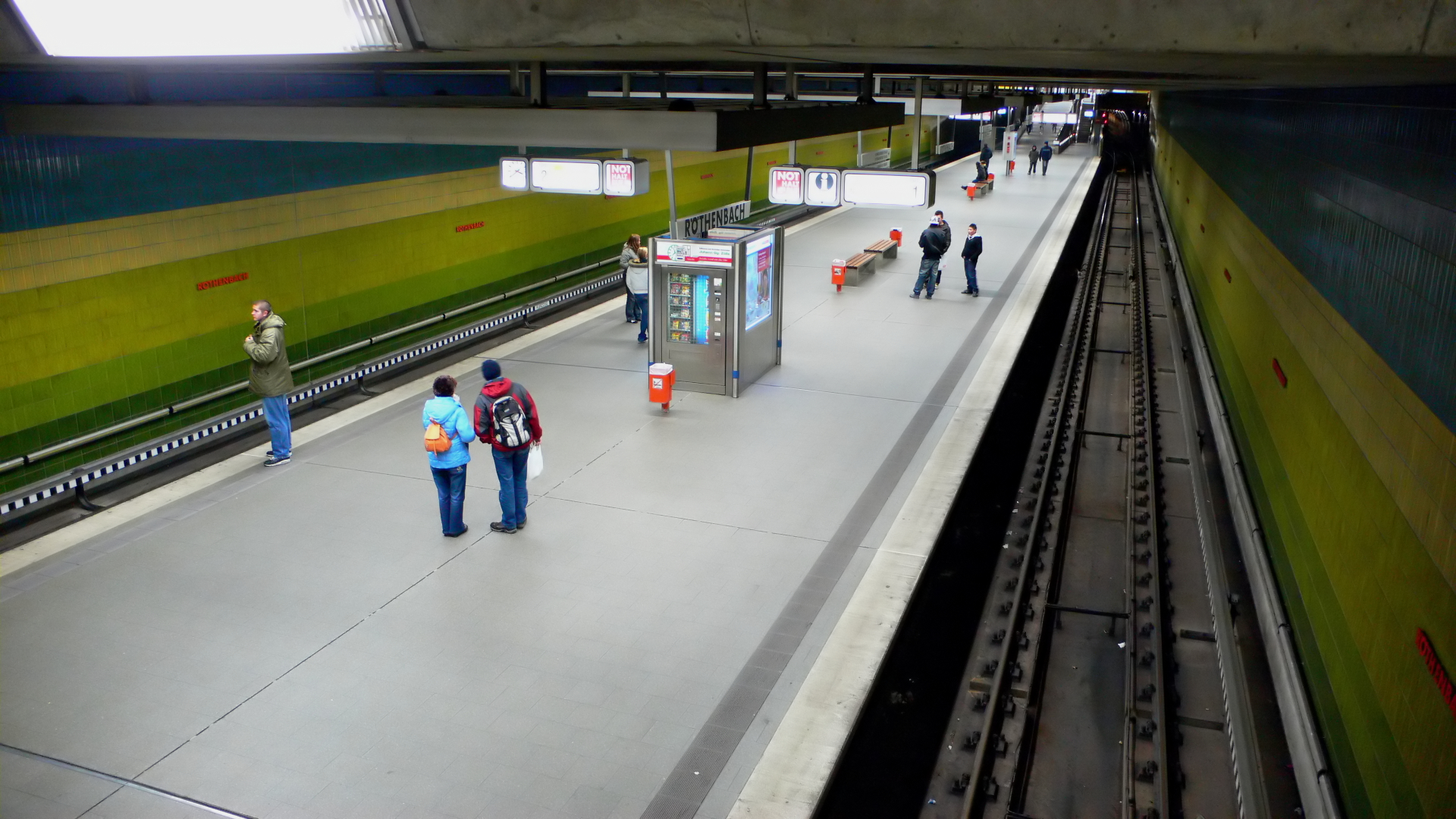

General information
- Location: Ansbacher Str. 90449 Nürnberg, Germany
- Coordinates: 49.4208722°N 11.0317311°E
- System: Nuremberg U-Bahn station
- Operator: Verkehrs-Aktiengesellschaft Nürnberg
- Connections: Bus: 35 Röthenbach - Nordostbf; 60 Röthenbach - Bremer Str. Wende; 61 Röthenbach - Schwabach Bf bzw. Busbf Süd; 62 Röthenbach - Kornburg; 63 Röthenbach - Goethering; 64 Röthenbach - Fabergut; 65 Röthenbach - Mögeldorf; 66 Röthenbach - Pillenreuth; 67 Frankenstraße - Fürth Hauptbf; 68 Gustav-Adolf-Str. - Langwasser Mitte; 69 Röthenbach - Gustav-Adolf-Str.; 98 Stein Schloß - Langwasser Mitte; 713 Nürnberg - Heilsbronn - (Neuendettelsau)

Construction
- Structure type: Underground

Other information
- Fare zone: VGN: 200

History
- Opened: 27 September 1986

Services
Preceding station	Nuremberg U-Bahn	Following station
Terminus	U2	Hohe Marter towards Flughafen
Location

Röthenbach station is a Nuremberg U-Bahn station and is the terminus of the U2 line.
