= Verkehrs-Aktiengesellschaft Nürnberg =

German public transport company

Verkehrs-Aktiengesellschaft Nürnberg (VAG)
- Company type: Aktiengesellschaft
- Industry: Public transport
- Predecessor: Nürnberg-Fürther Straßenbahn-Gesellschaft (1881–1903); Nürnberg-Fürther Straßenbahn (1903–1934); Städtische Werke Nürnberg (1934–1959)
- Founded: 1959
- Headquarters: Nuremberg, Germany
- Area served: Greater Nuremberg
- Key people: Josef Hasler (Chairman)
- Parent: Städtische Werke Nürnberg

The Verkehrs-Aktiengesellschaft Nürnberg (VAG; Nuremberg Transport Company) is the municipal company responsible for operating the U-Bahn, trams, and buses throughout the city of Nuremberg, in the state of Bavaria, Germany. VAG is a wholly owned subsidiary of Städtischen Werke Nürnberg (Nuremberg Municipal Works), and a member of the Verkehrsverbund Großraum Nürnberg (VGN; Integrated Transport Association of Greater Nuremberg).

== History ==
=== Nürnberg-Fürther Straßenbahn ===
On April 12, 1881, entrepreneur Heinrich Alfes from Bremen received a charter for the manufacture and operation of a Pferdebahn, a horse-drawn streetcar. The first line began operation on August 25, 1881, on the route Staatsbahnhof (current Nuremberg Hauptbahnhof) - Lorenzkirche - Plärrer - Bauerngasse. In 1883, the enterprise was reorganized into a private Aktiengesellschaft with the name Nürnberg-Fürther Straßenbahn-Gesellschaft, or Nuremberg-Fürth Streetcar Company. The company expanded to three lines, and between 1896 and 1898 all lines were electrified.

=== Municipal Ownership ===
In 1903, the company was taken over by the city of Nuremberg and operated under the name Nürnberg-Fürther Straßenbahn. Under municipal ownership, the streetcar operation saw steady growth. Although growth slowed during the First World War and the Great Depression, by 1939 the network around Nuremberg and Fürth had reached 20 lines, including one express line. Busses were introduced in 1923 and expanded to 60 busses by 1929.

In 1934, all public works were combined under one organization, and the streetcar division was given the name Städtische Werke Nürnberg, Abteilung Straßenbahn, or Nuremberg Public Works, Streetcar Division. However, the streetcars continued to use signage with the name Nürnberg-Fürther Straßenbahn through 1981. In 1939, the public works were again reorganized as Werke und Bahnen der Stadt der Reichsparteitage Nürnberg, Straßenbahn (Utilities and Trains of the City of the Reichsparty Nuremberg, Streetcars). Immediately following the Second World War, the division was renamed Werke und Bahnen der Stadt Nürnberg, Straßenbahn (Utilities and Trains Nuremberg, Streetcars), and on December 1, 1945, it was combined into the Städtische Werke Nürnberg – Verkehrsbetriebe (Nuremberg Municipal Works - Transport Operations). During the war, 95% of the overhead wires were destroyed, along with all of the depots. The streetcar network was rebuilt completely by 1955, and streetcars were supplemented with trolleybusses starting in 1948.

=== Verkehrs-Aktiengesellschaft Nürnberg ===
In 1959, the municipal utilities of Nuremberg were reorganized, and the Verkehrs-Aktiengesellschaft Nürnberg (VAG) was established as an independent enterprise, wholly owned by the Städtische Werke Nürnberg GmbH. The system busses started using the new VAG name immediately, although the streetcars still displayed the Nürnberg-Fürther Straßenbahn name until 1981.

== Services ==
=== Bus ===
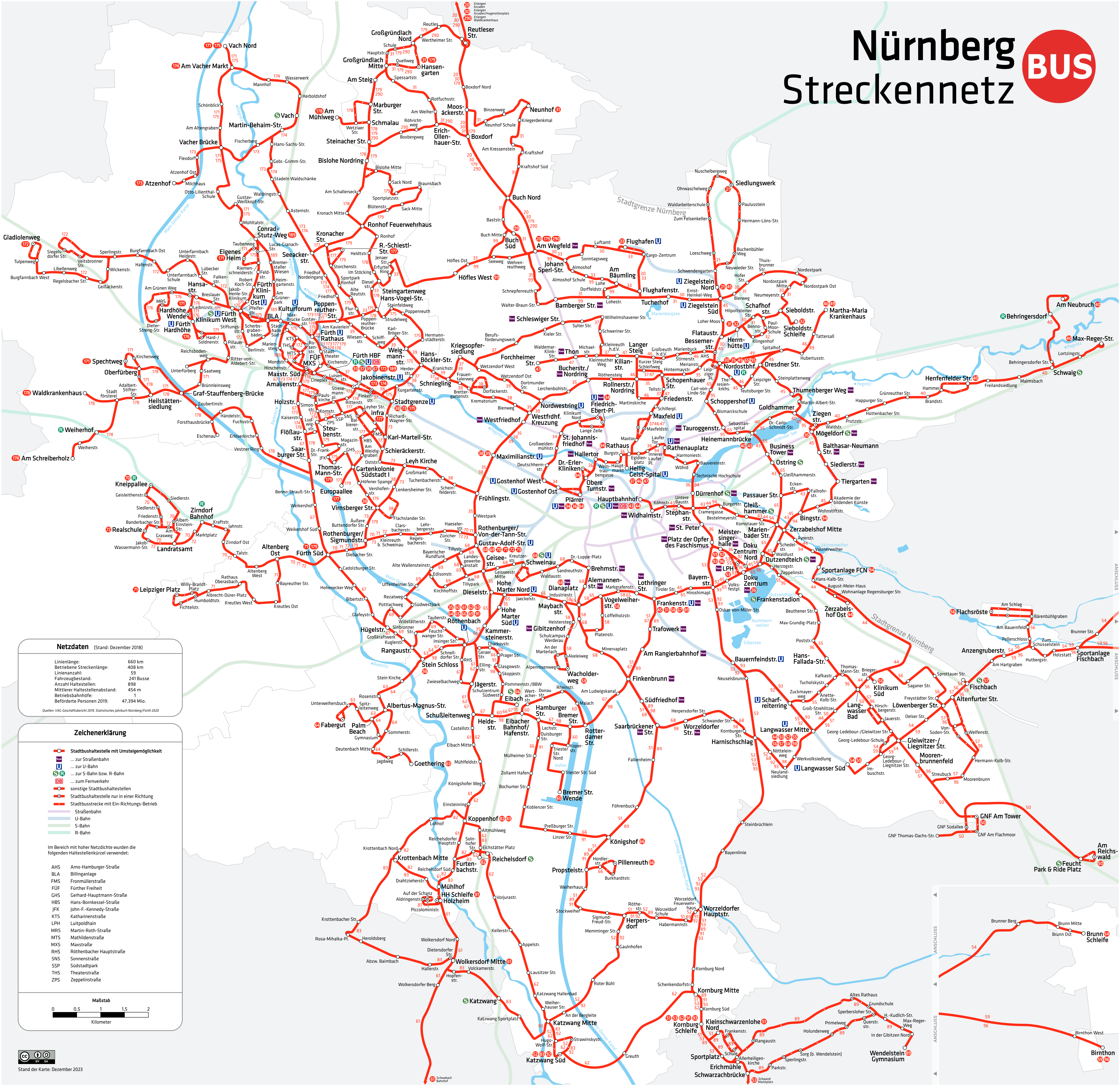
Nuremberg Bus Network

As of 2016, VAG operated 59 bus lines throughout Nuremberg. In addition to covering most areas within the city, 16 of the busses continue into neighboring areas including Fürth, Erlangen, and Schwabach. The city has designed many of the bus routes, and especially the Ring Lines, to feed commuters into other modes of public transportation such as streetcars, S-Bahn, and subway.

On weekend and holiday nights, VAG also operates the NightLiner in conjunction with the Erlanger Stadtwerke Stadtverkehr GmbH (ESTW), infra fürth verkehr gmbh (infra), and the Omnibusverkehr Franken (OVF). 28 NightLiner lines depart from the central Nuremberg Hauptbahnhof throughout the city and the surrounding region.

=== Trams ===
The streetcar network of the VAG encompasses 8 (9) lines and 79 stops over a track length of 36 km.

=== U-Bahn ===
The three subway lines operating in Nuremberg cover a track length of 36 km. All three lines meet at the central stations of Nuremberg Hauptbahnhof and Plärrer.
