= Verkehrsverbund Großraum Nürnberg =

Transit authority of Nuremberg, Germany

Verkehrsverbund Großraum Nürnberg (VGN)
- Industry: Public transport
- Founded: 1986
- Headquarters: Nuremberg, Germany
- Area served: Greater Nuremberg
- Revenue: 252,800,000 (2022)

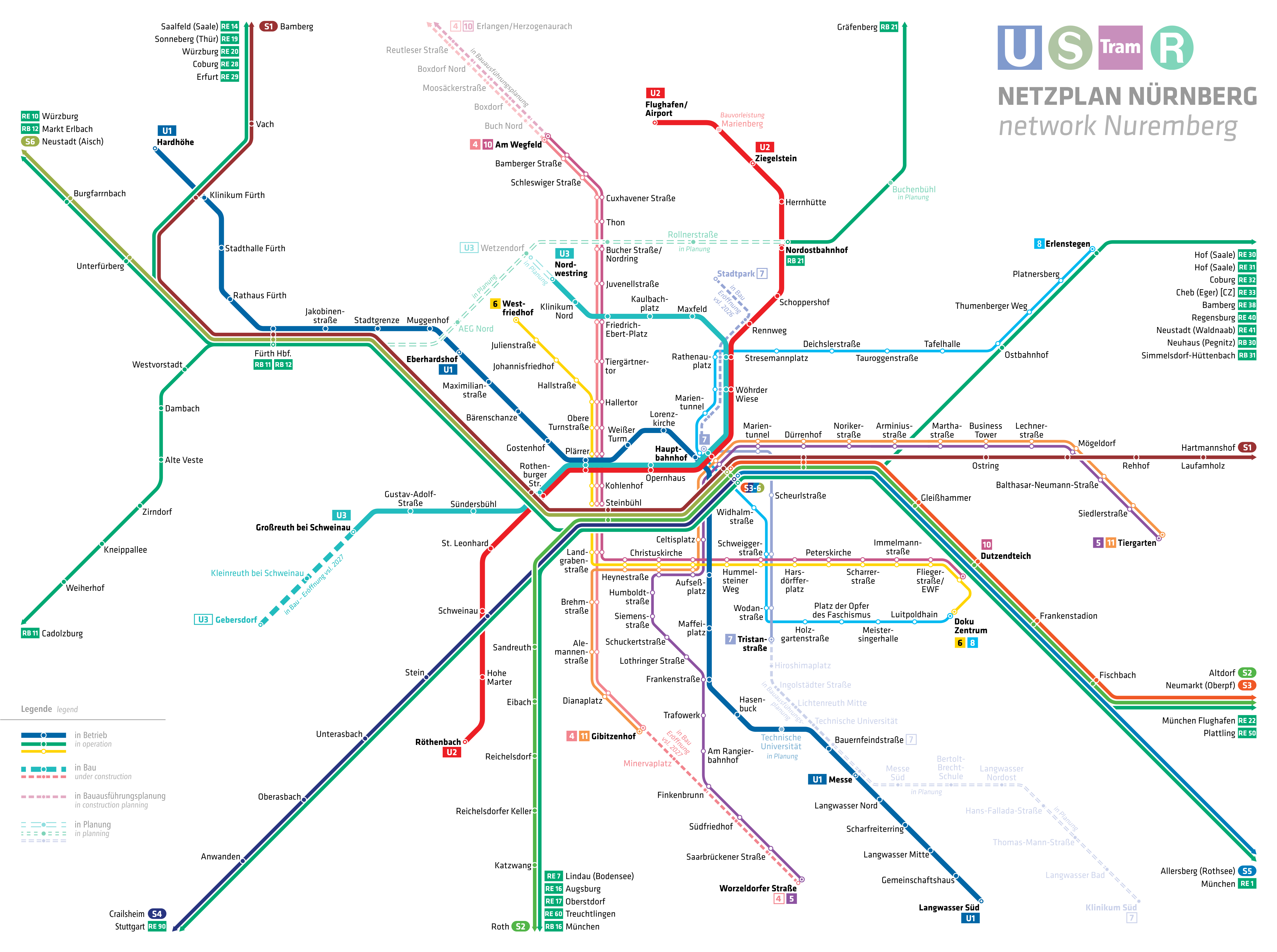
Public transport network in Nuremberg by train

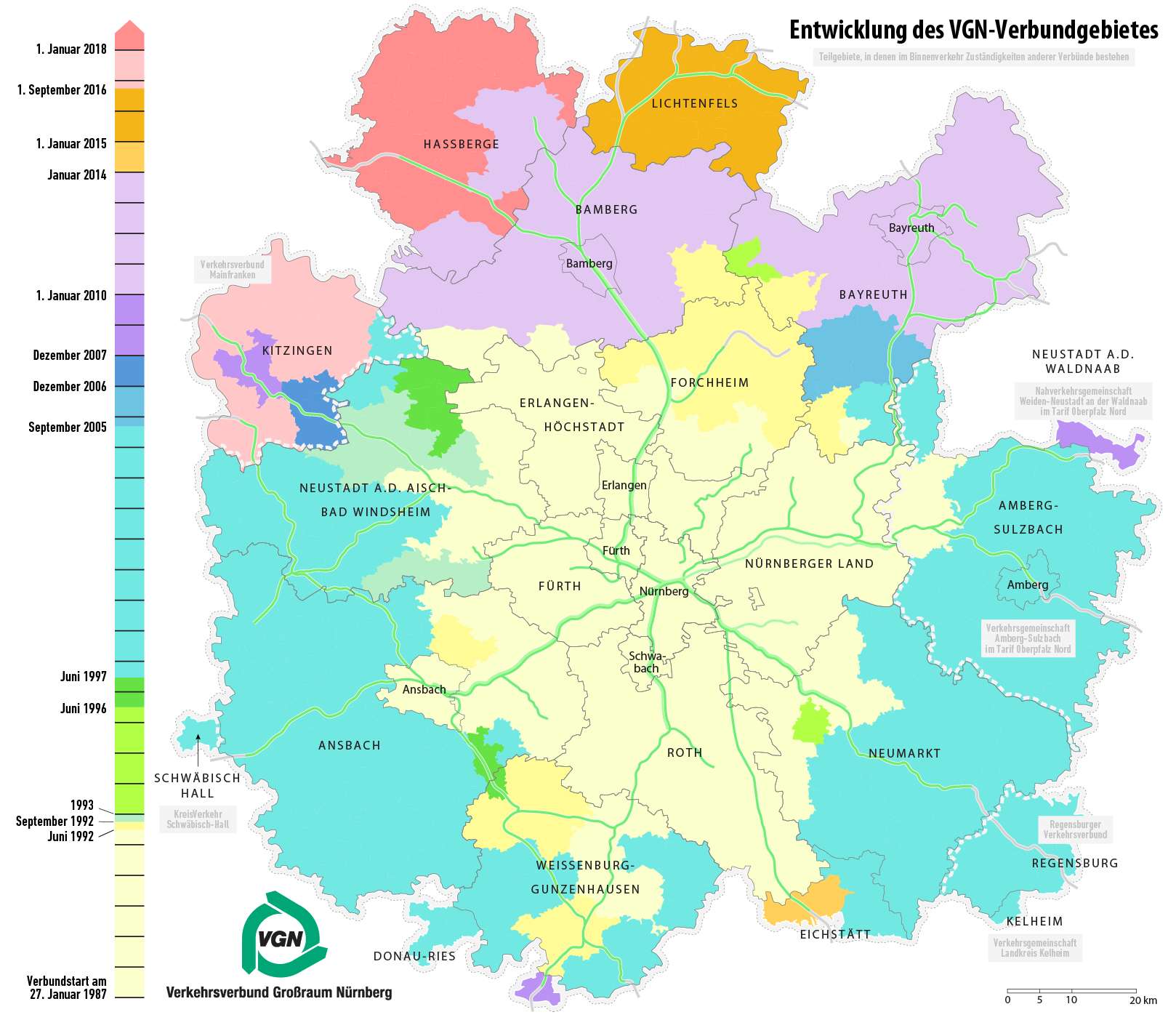
Development since 1986.

The Verkehrsverbund Großraum Nürnberg (VGN; Transport Association Region Nuremberg) is the transit authority of the city of Nuremberg, the second largest city of the German state of Bavaria. Its jurisdiction covers the city and its surrounding area, responsible for the Nuremberg S-Bahn commuter trains, the Nuremberg U-Bahn, the Nuremberg tramway and buses. While not co-extensive with the wider Nuremberg Metropolitan Region, it covers most of it with the exception of several smaller towns and rural areas on the periphery, as well as Sonneberg in the neighboring state of Thuringia.

The VGN coordinates transport and fares in area comprising the city of Nuremberg, Fürth, Erlangen, Schwabach, Bayreuth, Bamberg, Coburg, Ansbach, Amberg, Hof and 21 surrounding districts. It is jointly owned by the state of Bavaria, by the city of Nuremberg, Fürth, Erlangen, Schwabach, Bayreuth, Bamberg, Coburg, Ansbach, Amberg, Hof and the 21 surrounding districts, which are:

- Landkreis Amberg-Sulzbach
- Landkreis Ansbach
- Landkreis Bamberg
- Landkreis Bayreuth
- Landkreis Coburg
- Landkreis Erlangen-Höchstadt
- Landkreis Forchheim
- Landkreis Fürth
- Landkreis Haßberge
- Landkreis Hof
- Landkreis Kitzingen
- Landkreis Kronach
- Landkreis Kulmbach
- Landkreis Lichtenfels
- Landkreis Neumarkt
- Landkreis Neustadt an der Aisch-Bad Windsheim
- Landkreis Nürnberger Land
- Landkreis Roth
- Landkreis Tirschenreuth
- Landkreis Weißenburg-Gunzenhausen
- Landkreis Wunsiedel im Fichtelgebirge

There are some districts, which are also in some regions part of the VGN, they are:

- Landkreis Donau-Ries
- Landkreis Eichstätt
- Landkreis Kelheim
- Landkreis Neustadt an der Waldnaab
- Landkreis Regensburg
- Landkreis Schwäbisch Hall
- Sonneberg main station

Transport services are provided by over 10 companies. These include the Deutsche Bahn that also operates the S-Bahn, the Verkehrs-Aktiengesellschaft Nürnberg (VAG) that operates the U-Bahn, tramway and city buses, together with multiple operators of regional trains and buses.
