= Klinikum Nord station =

Metro station in Nuremberg, Germany

Klinikum Nord
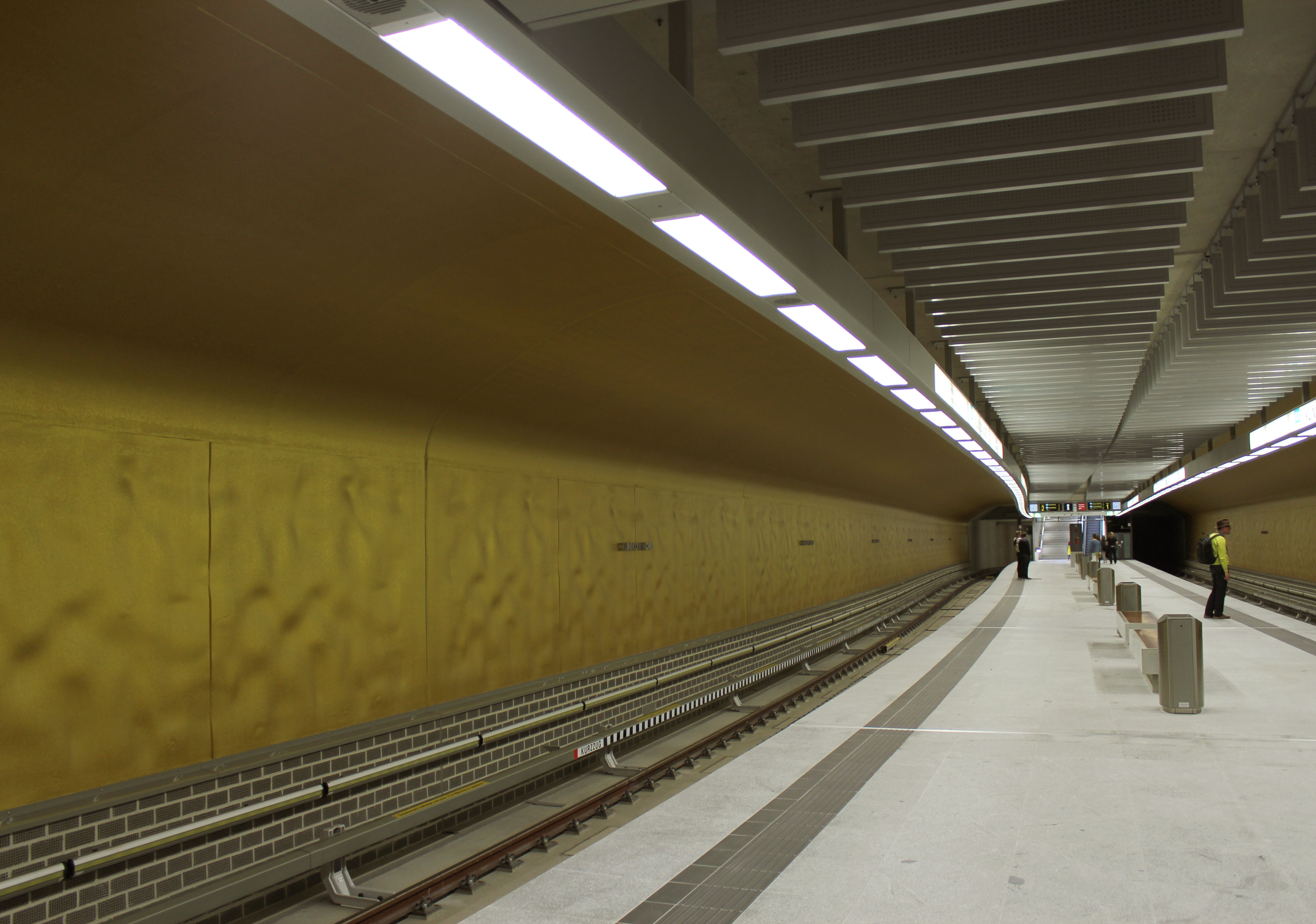

General information
- Location: Heimerichstraße; 90459 Nürnberg, Germany
- Coordinates: 49.4640°N 11.0646°E
- System: Nuremberg U-Bahn station
- Operator: Verkehrs-Aktiengesellschaft Nürnberg
- Tracks: 2

Construction
- Structure type: Underground

Other information
- Fare zone: VGN: 100

History
- Opened: 22 May 2017

Services
Preceding station	Nuremberg U-Bahn	Following station
Friedrich-Ebert-Platz towards Großreuth bei Schweinau	U3	Nordwestring Terminus
Location

Klinikum Nord station is a Nuremberg U-Bahn station which opened on 22 May 2017 and serves the line U3.
