= Sündersbühl station =

Metro station in Nuremberg, Germany

Sündersbühl
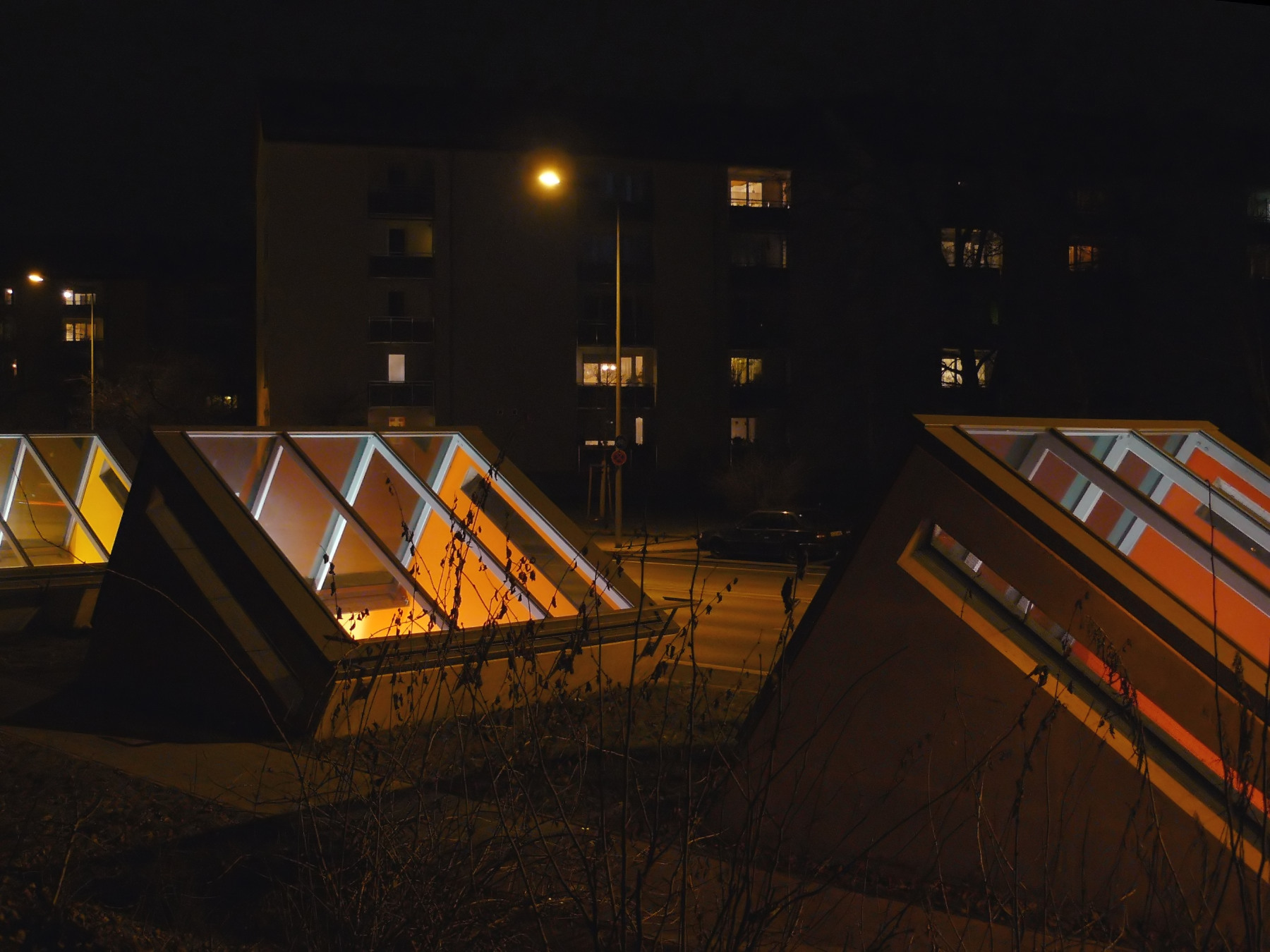

General information
- Location: Rothenburger Str. 90439 Nürnberg, Germany
- Coordinates: 49.4418315°N 11.0438853°E
- System: Nuremberg U-Bahn station
- Operator: Verkehrs-Aktiengesellschaft Nürnberg

Construction
- Structure type: Underground

Other information
- Fare zone: VGN: 100

History
- Opened: 14 June 2008

Services
Preceding station	Nuremberg U-Bahn	Following station
Gustav-Adolf-Straße towards Großreuth bei Schweinau	U3	Rothenburger Straße towards Nordwestring
Location

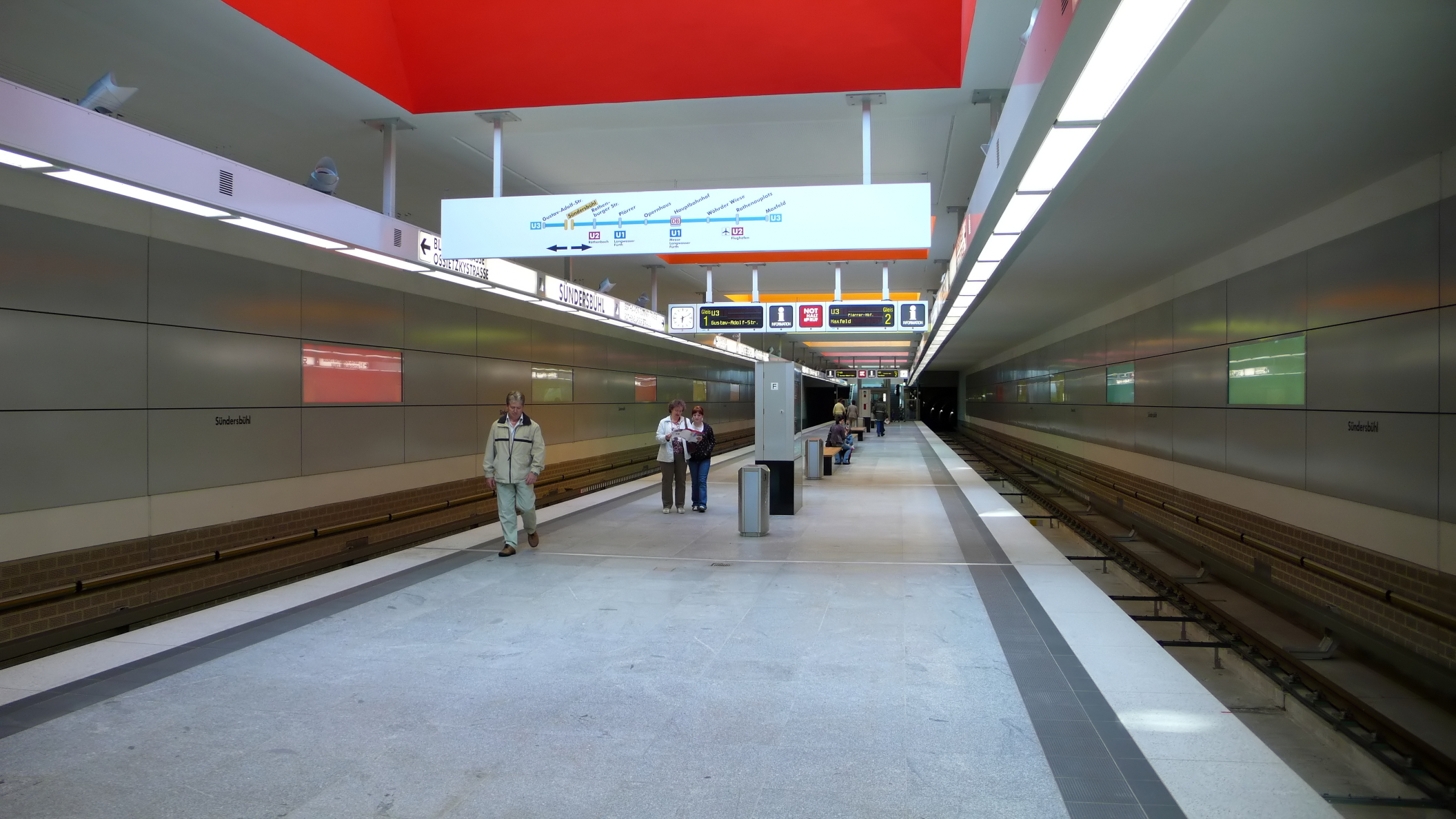
Sündersbühl station platforms

Sündersbühl station is a Nuremberg U-Bahn station, located on the U3.
