= Kaulbachplatz station =

Metro station in Nuremberg, Germany

Kaulbachplatz
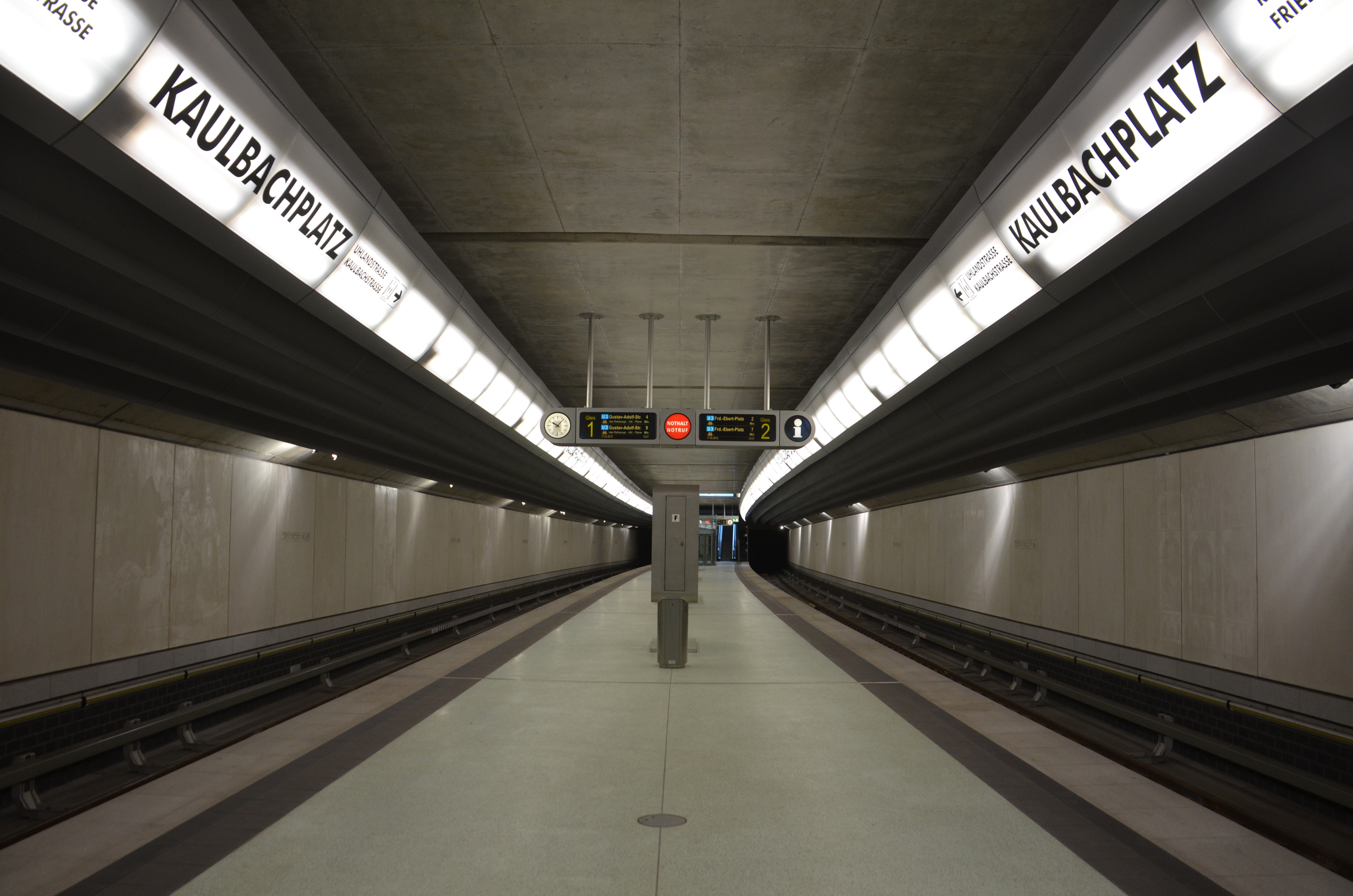

General information
- Location: Schweppermannstraße; 90408 Nürnberg, Germany
- Coordinates: 49.4633594°N 11.0785377°E
- System: Nuremberg U-Bahn station
- Operator: Verkehrs-Aktiengesellschaft Nürnberg

Construction
- Structure type: Underground

Other information
- Fare zone: VGN: 100

History
- Opened: 11 December 2011

Services
Preceding station	Nuremberg U-Bahn	Following station
Maxfeld towards Großreuth bei Schweinau	U3	Friedrich-Ebert-Platz towards Nordwestring
Location

Kaulbachplatz station is a Nuremberg U-Bahn station, located on the U3.
