= Friedrich-Ebert-Platz station =

Metro station in Nuremberg, Germany

Friedrich-Ebert-Platz
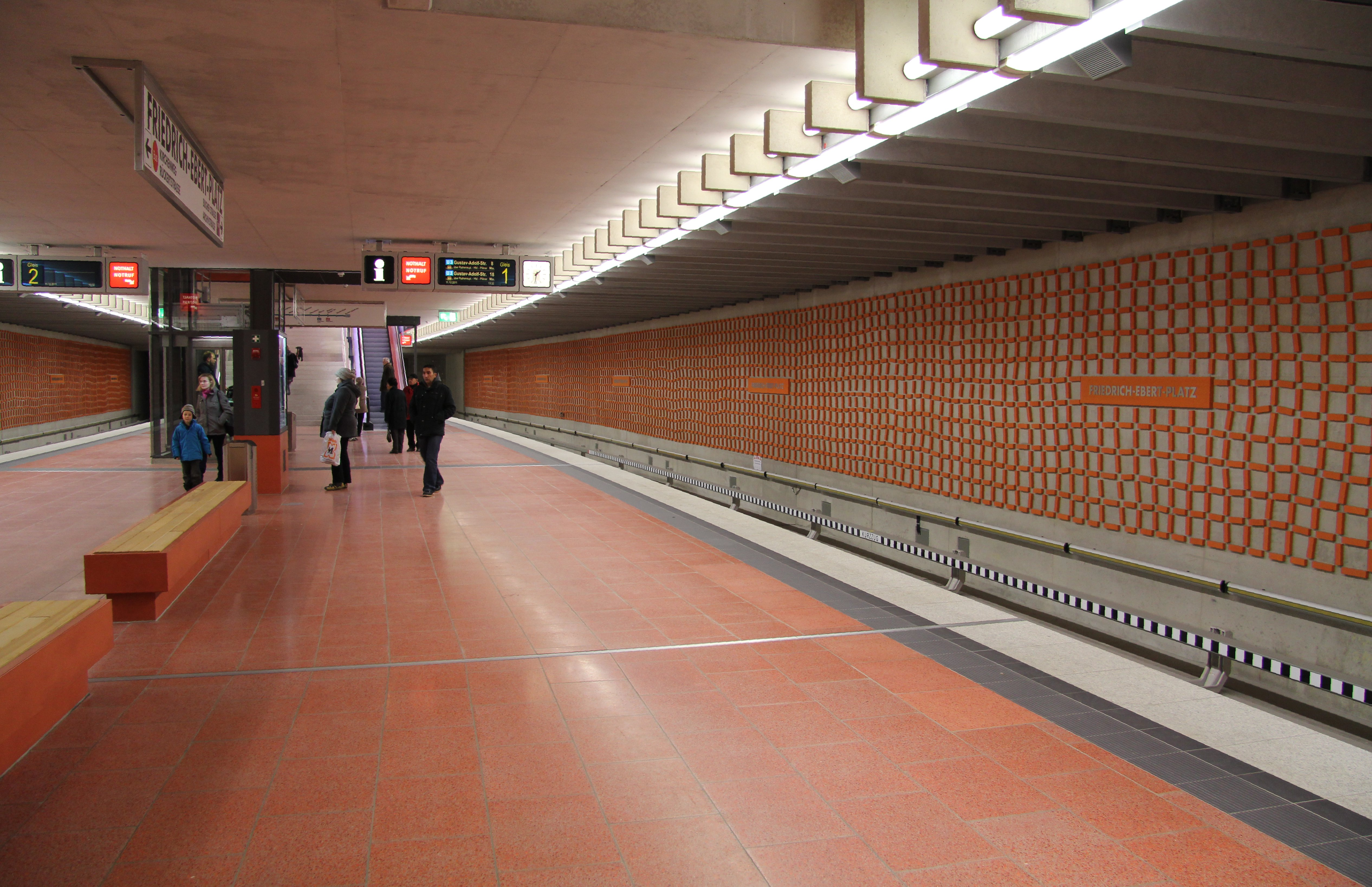

General information
- Location: Wölckernstraße; 90459 Nürnberg, Germany
- Coordinates: 49.4626295°N 11.0713496°E
- System: Nuremberg U-Bahn station
- Operator: Verkehrs-Aktiengesellschaft Nürnberg
- Connections: Tram: Gibitzenhof – Thon; Bus: 34 Plärrer - Thon

Construction
- Structure type: Underground

Other information
- Fare zone: VGN: 100

History
- Opened: 11 December 2011

Services
Preceding station	Nuremberg U-Bahn	Following station
Kaulbachplatz towards Großreuth bei Schweinau	U3	Klinikum Nord towards Nordwestring
Location

Friedrich-Ebert-Platz station is a Nuremberg U-Bahn station. It was the northern terminus of the U3 line from its opening on 10 December 2011 until 2017, when the extension towards Nordwestring opened. It offers interchange to Tramway line 4. Like Aufseßplatz, Hauptbahnhof and Plärrer orange tiles were used in the walls of this station to indicate a possible future interchange station. However, as of 2021 no such interchange to another subway line is planned for the foreseeable future.

== Name ==
The station is named after the square beneath which it lies, which is in turn named after Germany's first Reichspräsident, the SPD politician Friedrich Ebert. Rathenauplatz station is another important Nuremberg U-Bahn station named (indirectly) after a Weimar Republic politician.
