= U3 (Nuremberg U-Bahn) =

Underground railway line in Nuremberg, Germany

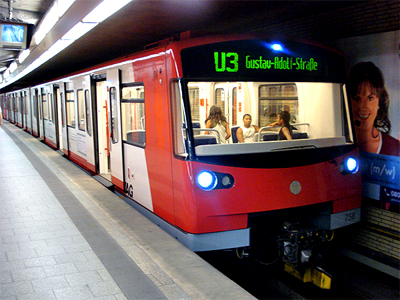

Overview
- Termini: Nordwestring; Großreuth
- Stations: 14

Service
- Type: Rapid transit
- System: Nuremberg U-Bahn
- Operator(s): Verkehrs-Aktiengesellschaft Nürnberg
- Rolling stock: VAG Class DT3

History
- Opened: 14 June 2008; 17 years ago
- Latest extension: 15 October 2020

Technical
- Line length: 9.2 km (5.7 mi)
- Number of tracks: two
- Track gauge: 1,435 mm (4 ft 8 1/2 in) standard gauge
- Electrification: 750 V DC third rail

The U3 is an U-Bahn line in Nuremberg. The line was opened on 14 June 2008. It has 14 stations along its 9.2 kilometres (5.7 mi) long route, making it the shortest in the system. The termini are Nordwestring and Großreuth. Its rolling stock has been entirely driverless since the opening. U3 shares part of its route (from Rathenauplatz to Rothenburger Straße) with the older U2. Due to the circuitous horseshoe-shaped route, U3 is not always the fastest public transit option between its stations. For example, the buses that run along B4R are - per the official schedules - faster for getting from Nordwestring to Gustav Adolf Straße and the tramway line 4 is faster for getting from Friedrich Ebert Platz to Plärrer than the respective U3 connection.

== History ==
While the original plans of the U-Bahn network called for at least three main trunk lines on dedicated corridors, financial constraints and the decision not to abandon the Tram network, as had been planned at the time the U-Bahn began construction, made it clear that, after the construction of the U2, a third trunk line would only be economical if the Tram network was fully abandoned. A political consensus emerged to keep the Tram network, but still expand the U-Bahn system, if a bit slower and more moderately. Therefore, it was decided to use parts of existing tunnels for the U3 instead of building an entire dedicated tunnel. However, as it was deemed impossible to reduce the frequency and the existing signalling system of the U2 was already at its limits, the decision was taken to automate the existing line to allow for higher capacity. The new U3 thus opened as the first fully automated underground railway line in Germany and has been fully driverless from its first day of commercial operations. The U2 was automated in the following two years whereas U1, the oldest and longest line in the system and the only one to operate outside the municipal boundaries of Nuremberg is still fully driver operated. U3, which forms a rough C-shape with both branches lying to the West of downtown, has been extended twice on its northern branch, first in 2011 with the two new stations Kaulbachplatz and Friedrich-Ebert-Platz and then again in 2017 with the two new stations Klinikum Nord and Nordwestring. The 2011 extension of the northern branch of the U3 led to the most recent major permanent shutdown of service on part of the Nuremberg tramway network, as regular service on the Pirckheimer Straße was shut down while the tracks and overhead wires were maintained as a backup in case of closures on other routes. An extension of the southern branch towards Großreuth was opened on 15 October 2020. Further extensions are under construction along the southern branch of U3.

== Planned extensions ==
Out of all Nuremberg U-Bahn lines, U3 is the youngest and the only one with extensions currently under construction. After the northern branch reached an endpoint for the time being at Nordwestring in May 2017, construction is ongoing along the southern branch. An extension west towards Großreuth bei Schweinau was opened on 15 October 2020. Further extensions towards Kleinreuth bei Schweinau and Gebersdorf are already under construction. There is a longstanding plan to use part or all of the old Bibertbahn right of way for further extensions. An expansion of the Northern branch is not planned as of 2018 but variously debated and suggested politically.

== Stations ==
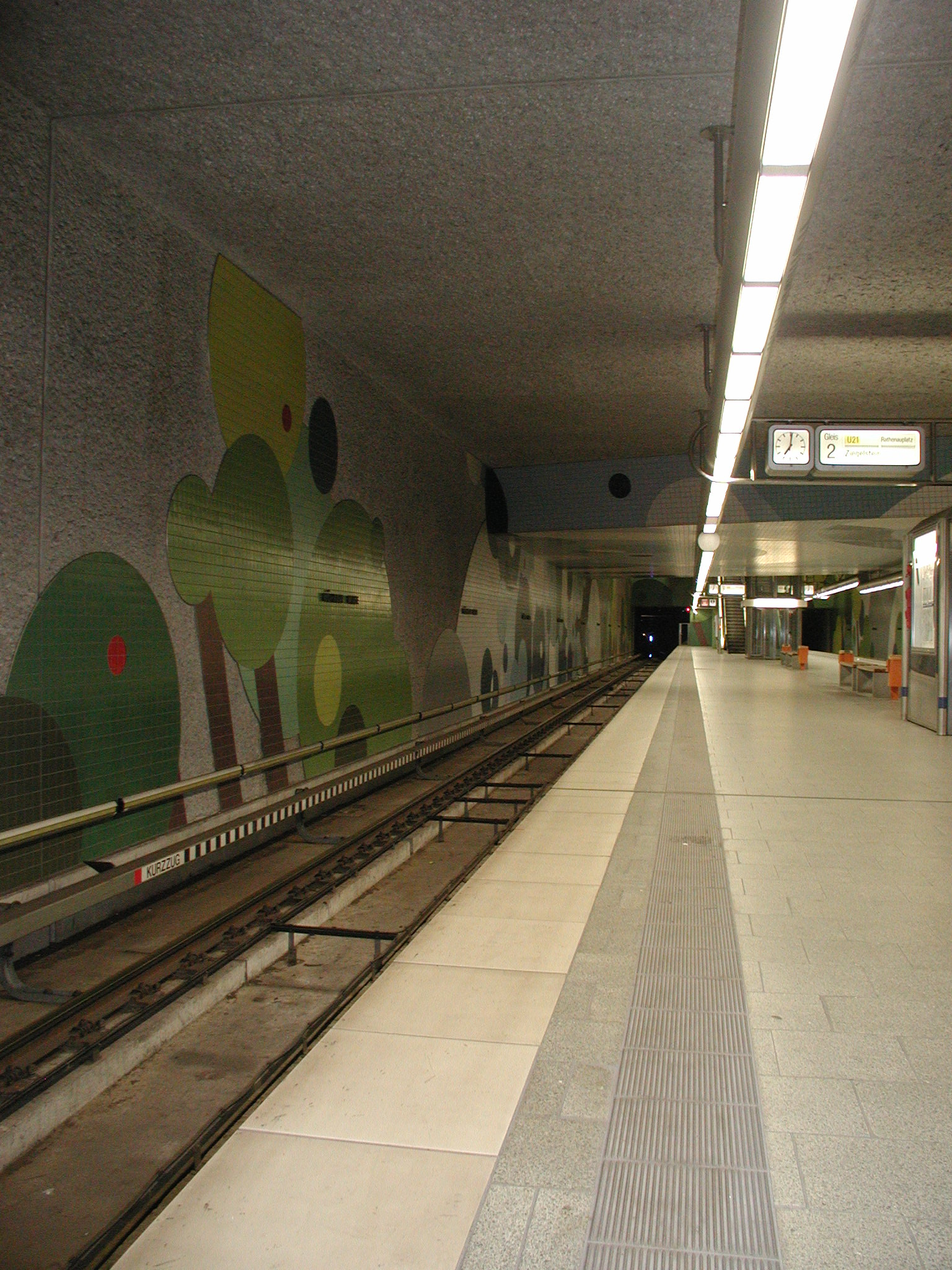
The Undergroundstation Wöhrder Wiese

Stations	Transfers
U3
Gebersdorf	planned opening 2027
Kleinreuth	planned opening 2027
Großreuth	
Gustav-Adolf-Straße	Bus
Sündersbühl	
Rothenburger Straße	U2 S1
Plärrer	U1 U2 Nuremberg tramway Bus
Opernhaus	U2
Hauptbahnhof	U1 U2 S1 S2 S3 S4 S5 S6 R-Bahn Deutsche Bahn Nuremberg tramway Bus
Wöhrder Wiese	U2 Nuremberg tramway
Rathenauplatz	U2 Nuremberg tramway Bus
Maxfeld	Bus
Kaulbachplatz	
Friedrich-Ebert-Platz	Nuremberg tramway Bus
Klinikum Nord	
Nordwestring	Bus

== Operations ==
During the rush hour peak, trains on U3 leave every 3 1/3 minutes (200 seconds) which overlaps with U2 to a 100-second headway between Rathenauplatz and Rothenburger Straße. There is no service at night (roughly between 1 AM and 5 AM) not even on weekends. A few trains beginning on the U3 branches (Nordwestring and Großreuth) are routed to the U2 branch instead (Röthenbach and Airport respectively) and vice versa.

== Opening dates and construction costs ==
Opened Segment	Number of Stations	length	cost (nominal)	date opened	cost (inflation adjusted)	cost per km (inflation adjusted)
Plärrer ↔ Rothenburger Straße*	2	0.97 kilometres (0.60 mi)	163 million DM†	28 January 1984	160,121,194€†	66,717,164€
Plärrer ↔ Hauptbahnhof*	2	1.3 kilometres (0.81 mi)	120 million DM	23 September 1988	112,638,055€	86,644,658€
Hauptbahnhof ↔ Rathenauplatz*	2	1.3 kilometres (0.81 mi)	125 million DM	24 September 1990	112,782,110€	86,755,469€
Gustav-Adolf-Straße ↔ Rothenburger Straße	2	1.6 kilometres (0.99 mi)	70 million €	14 June 2008	84,743,318€	52,964,574€
Rathenauplatz ↔ Maxfeld	1	1.2 kilometres (0.75 mi)	45 million €	14 June 2008	54,477,847€	45,398,206€
Maxfeld ↔ Friedrich Ebert Platz	2	1.1 kilometres (0.68 mi)	66 million €	11 December 2011	76,798,372€	69,816,702€
Friedrich Ebert Platz ↔ Nordwestring	2	1.1 kilometres (0.68 mi)	86 million €	22 May 2017	91,986,275€	83,623,886€
Gustav-Adolf-Straße ↔ Großreuth bei Schweinau	1	1.1 kilometres (0.68 mi)	69 million €	15 October 2020	71,152,174€	64,683,794€

* built and opened as part of U2

† cost given for longer section from Plärrer to Schweinau

== Rolling stock ==
Due to having relied on automatic operation from day one, U3 has only ever had the VAG Class DT3 rolling stock, which was designed for automatic operation. The VAG Class G1 currently in use on U1 is capable of both automatic and manual operation and could in the future be used on U3 but isn't as of 2022.

== See also ==
- Nuremberg U-Bahn
  - U1 (Nuremberg U-Bahn)
  - U2 (Nuremberg U-Bahn)
- Nuremberg S-Bahn
  - S1 (Nuremberg)
  - S2 (Nuremberg)
  - S3 (Nuremberg)
  - S4 (Nuremberg)
