= Nuremberg U-Bahn =

Rapid transit system

Overview
- Locale: Nuremberg, Fürth
- Transit type: Rapid transit
- Number of lines: 3
- Number of stations: 49
- Daily ridership: 410,000 As of 2017
- Annual ridership: 111 million (2023)
- Website: VAG Nürnberg

Operation
- Began operation: March 1, 1972; 54 years ago
- Operator: Verkehrs-Aktiengesellschaft Nürnberg
- Number of vehicles: 32 VAG Class DT3; 14 VAG Class DT3-F; 35 VAG Class G1
- Train length: 4-car-trains (exclusively on U1, mainly on U2&U3); 2-car-trains (some services on U2&U3)
- Headway: 100 seconds to 10 minutes

Technical
- System length: 38.2 km (23.7 mi)
- Track gauge: standard gauge
- Electrification: 750 V DC third rail
- Average speed: 33.4 km/h (20.8 mph)
- Top speed: 80 km/h (50 mph)
System map
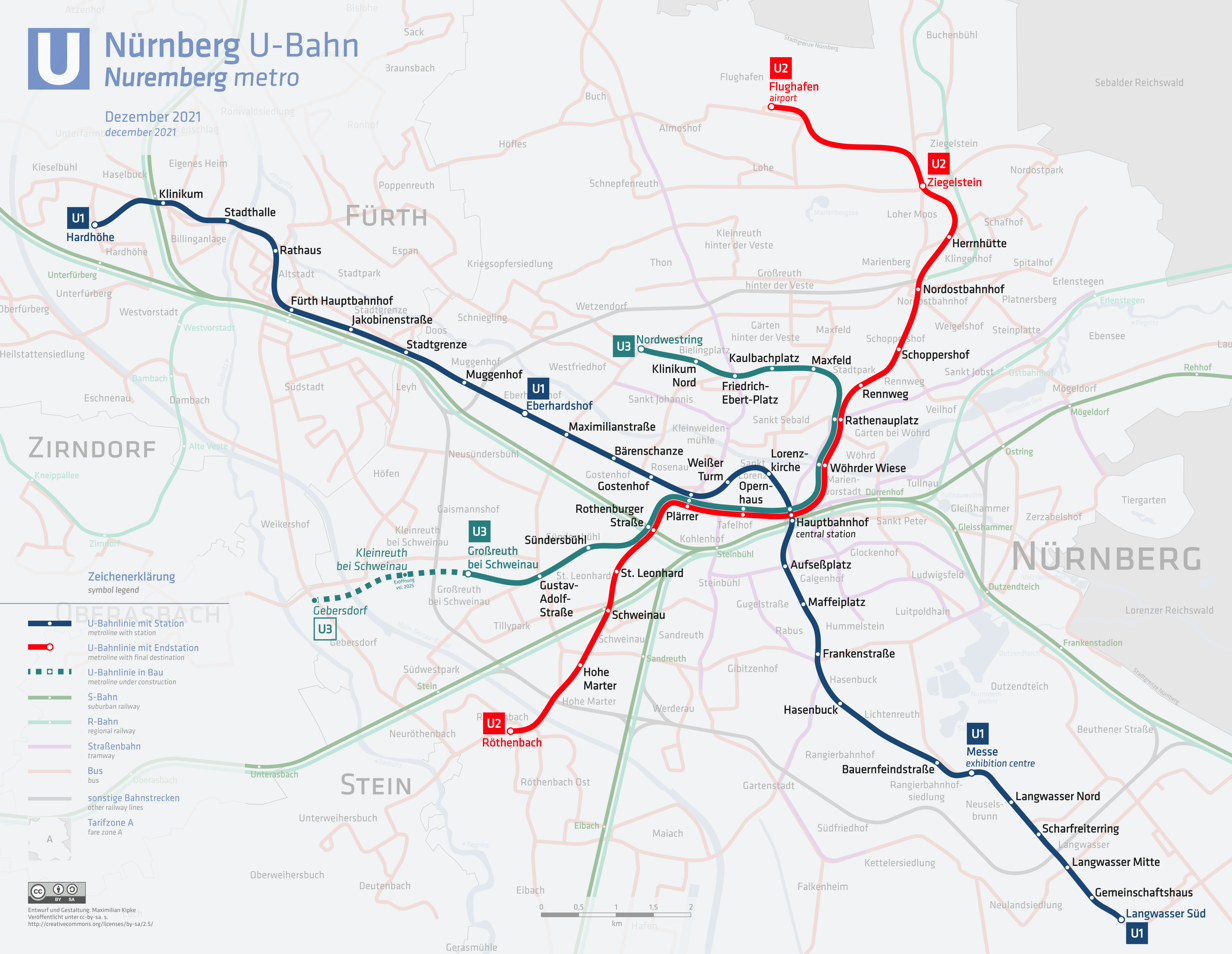
Key

The Nuremberg U-Bahn is a rapid transit system in Nuremberg and Fürth, Bavaria. It is operated by Verkehrs-Aktiengesellschaft Nürnberg (VAG; Nuremberg Transport Corporation), which itself is a member of the Verkehrsverbund Großraum Nürnberg (VGN; Greater Nuremberg Transport Network). The Nuremberg U-Bahn is Germany's newest metro system, having begun operation in 1972, although the Nuremberg-Fürth route (U1) uses part of the right of way of the Bavarian Ludwig Railway, which was Germany's first passenger railway opened in 1835. The current network of the U-Bahn is composed of three lines, serving 49 stations, and comprising 38.2 kilometres (23.7 mi) of operational route, making it the shortest of the four heavy-rail metro systems in Germany, behind Berlin, Hamburg and Munich.

In 2008, driverless and fully automated trains were introduced on the new U3 line, making it Germany's first automatic U-Bahn line. U2 was converted to driverless operation by 2010, the first such conversion anywhere in the world.

== History ==
Plan for a metro between Central Station and Fürth in 1925

Plans for a metro in Nuremberg go back to 1925, when Nuremberg graduate engineer Oscar Freytag spoke out in favor of building a metro under Fürther Straße. His proposal was not to replace the parallel tram but rather to complement it with a faster connection. In addition, the proposed subway should be extended over the Plärrer along the Frauentorgraben to Nuremberg Central Station. At that time, however, the project never got beyond ideas and talks because of the high technical complexity and the costs. The first real forerunners of a metro came in 1938 during the Nazi era, when the tram routes were buried under Allersberger Straße and Bayernstraße. These facilities, still in existence but no longer used for passenger service, were built to not disturb the tram by the deployment columns of the SS barracks and the masses of visitors of the rallies held on the adjacent Nazi party rally grounds in their operations.

Only after the Second World War and with the onset of the economic miracle and the increasing motorization of the population were new plans for an "underground tram" ("Unterpflasterstraßenbahn" – "sub pavement tram" in German) set up. The suggestion of the Ulm professor Max-Erich Feuchtinger to move the tram between Plärrer and main station under the earth, was rejected by the Nuremberg city council on 19 March 1958. In 1962, the city council commissioned the Stuttgart traffic scientist Professor Walther Lambert to prepare an opinion on the future of Nuremberg public transport. The "Lambert report" with the recommendation to build an underground tram was published in 1963, and so the city council voted on 24 April 1963 to go ahead and build such a system with the option of a later conversion to full metro. This would've been in line with contemporary Stadtbahn projects in Stuttgart, Hannover or the Ruhr area.

On 24 November 1965 the city council reversed its decision of 1963 and decided to build a classic metro. This was preceded by a personal statement by Hans von Hanffstengel, head of the Nuremberg city planning office, on the opinion of Professor Lambert. Hanffstengel spoke out against the "temporary" solution of an underground tram and demanded the direct construction of a full underground. He was supported indirectly by the federal government, which offered a participation in the construction costs of 50%, and the then Bavarian Prime Minister Alfons Goppel, who assured the financial equality of the Nuremberg metro plans with those of the state capital. Other reasons brought forth at the time were the claimed necessity to close the entire line during a conversion (from underground tram to metro) for a period of several years.

=== Planning a basic network ===
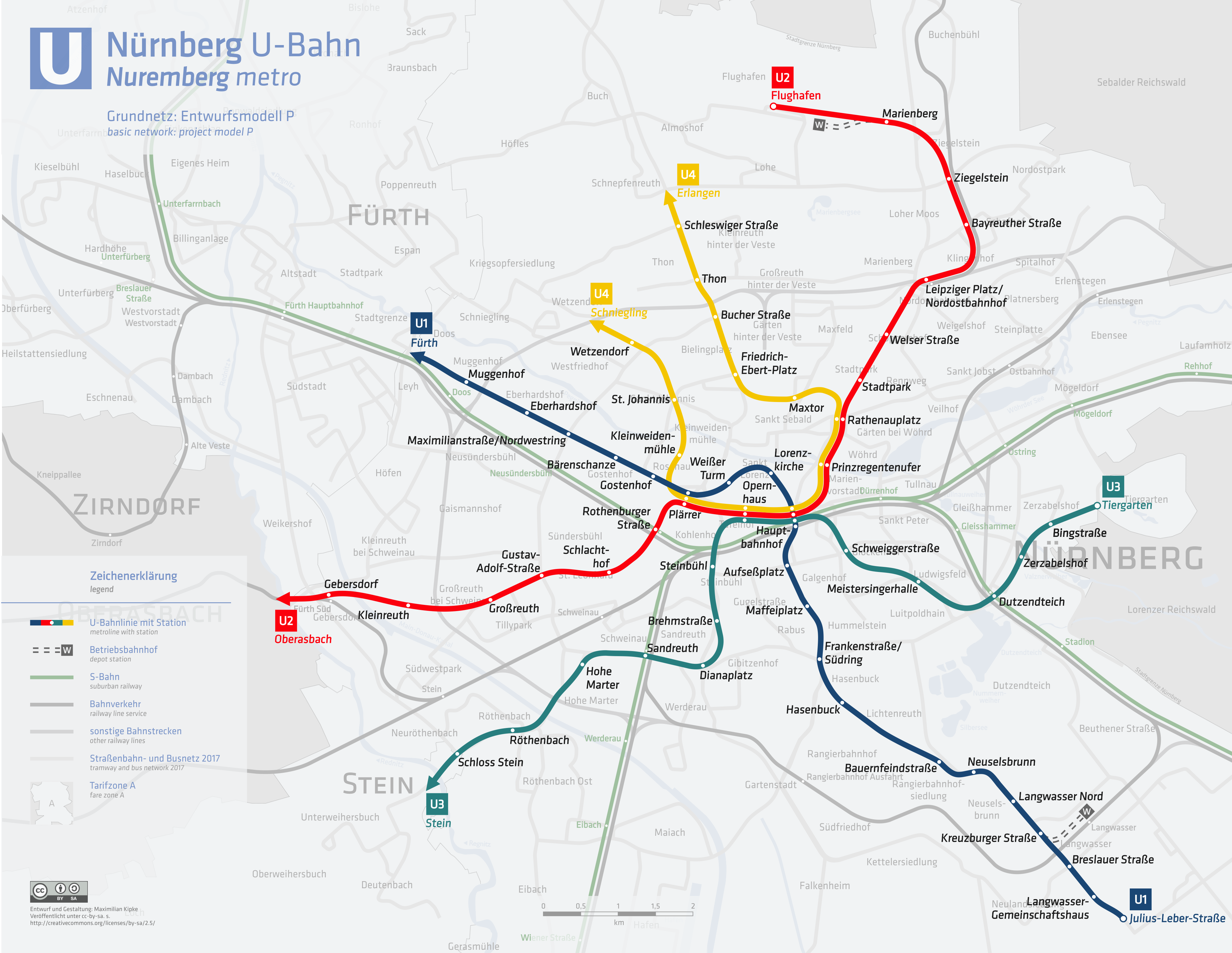
Modell "P"

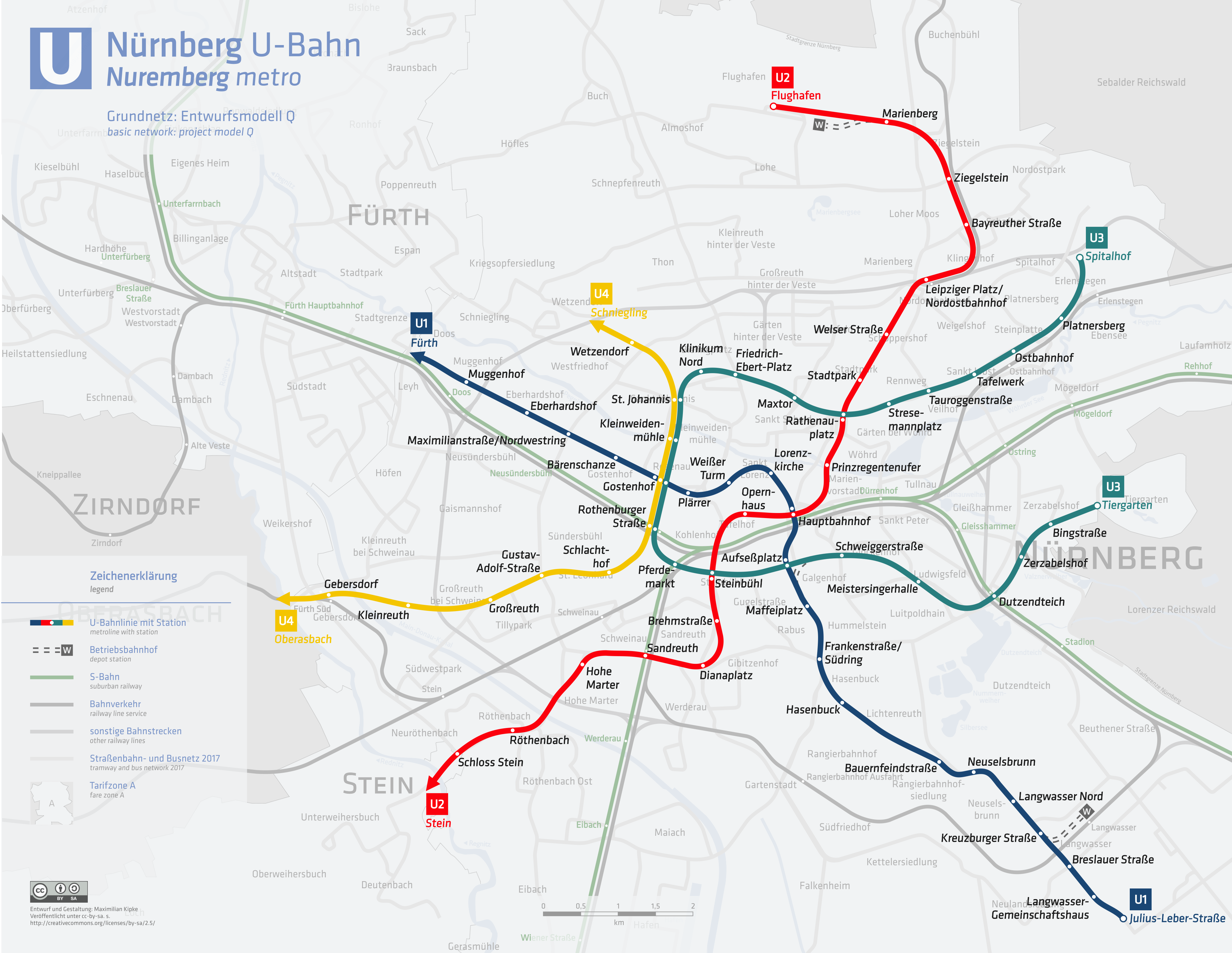
Modell "Q"

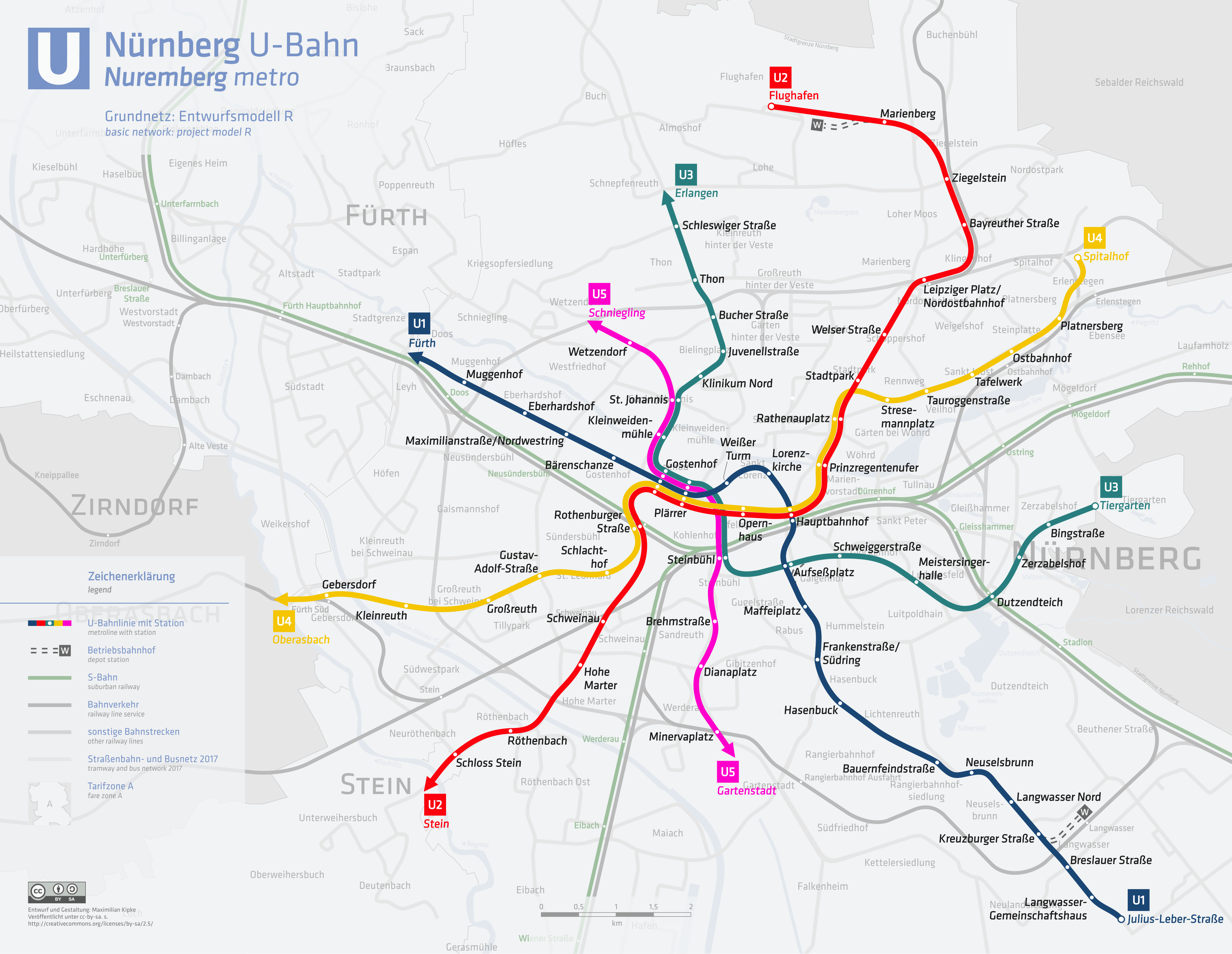
Modell "R"

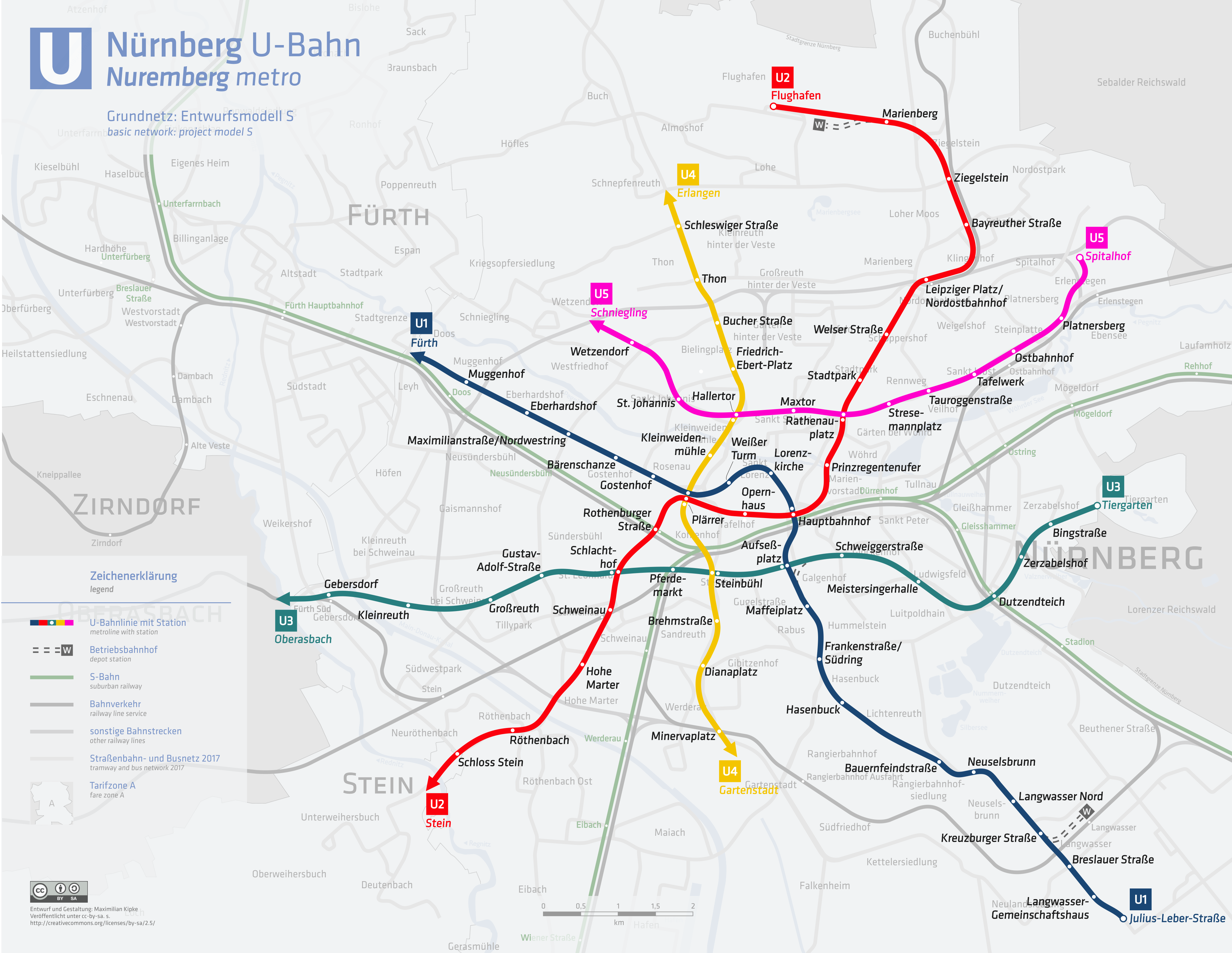
Modell "S"

Initial considerations for a metro network already existed after the City Council decision of 1965, but concrete Grundnetz (starting or basic network) planning began only in the late 1960s after the adoption of the land-use plan of 1969. The first metro axis (what is now U1) was at this time already under construction and thus included in all variants. It was to connect the newly emerging satellite town of Langwasser via the main station, the old town and the Plärrer with Fürth and follows essentially the former tram line 1. Important goals for the other lines were the connection of the destinations airport, Meistersingerhalle, Municipal Hospital (today: Klinikum Nord ) and Tiergarten, covering as much of the urban area with as few stops as possible and the easy possibility to extend the base network into new urban development zones. All these considerations eventually led to a large number of network proposals, of which the models P, Q, R and S most closely approximated the specifications.

==== Model P ====
In the model "P" all lines connect at the main railway station as a central hub, which brings the advantage of offering easy connections between all modes of transport (U-Bahn, S-Bahn, long-distance trains and Buses at the ZOB). The main drawbacks would be a potential overburdening of the single interchange station (compare Châtelet–Les Halles in Paris) and the difficulty of tunneling in several levels (for the various lines) near the center of the historic old town. Further problems were identified with the Hauptbahnhof-Plärrer main trunk line. The lines would be as follows:

- U1: Langwasser – Hauptbahnhof (Main Railway Station) – Altstadt (Old Town) – Plärrer – Fürth
- U2: Flughafen (Airport) – Rathenauplatz – Hauptbahnhof – Opernhaus (Opera House) – Plärrer – Gebersdorf
- U3: Tiergarten (Zoo) – Hauptbahnhof – Opernhaus – Röthenbach
- U4: Thon – Rathenauplatz – Hauptbahnhof – Opernhaus – Plärrer – Wetzendorf

==== Model Q ====
The "Q" model is based on a new settlement axis between Nuremberg and Fürth along the Willstraße and new road tangents to be served by the U3 line. Positive effects are attributed to this network model for the development of the new settlement axis, negative could be the transfer links from the U3 to the city center and the supply of defective trains to the depots. The line network would look like this:

- U1: Langwasser – Aufseßplatz – Hauptbahnhof – Altstadt – Plärrer – Gostenhof – Fürth
- U2: Flughafen – Rathenauplatz – Hauptbahnhof – Steinbühl – Röthenbach
- U3: Tiergarten – Aufseßplatz – Steinbühl – Schlachthof – Gostenhof – St. Johannis – Rathenauplatz – Erlenstegen
- U4: Gebersdorf – Schlachthof – Gostenhof – St. Johannis – Wetzendorf

==== Model R ====
In the model "R", the three main lines intersect in the points Aufseßplatz, Hauptbahnhof and Plärrer and thus correspond to a classic network concept, which was similarly applied in Munich among other cities. An advantage would be a uniform utilization and development potential of all lines, a possible disadvantage would be unwanted settlement developments along the U3 north direction Thon and the U5 South direction Gartenstadt (urban sprawl). The lines would be as follows:

- U1: Langwasser – Aufseßplatz – Hauptbahnhof – Altstadt – Plärrer – Gostenhof – Fürth
- U2: Flughafen – Rathenauplatz – Hauptbahnhof – Plärrer – Gostenhof – Schlachthof – Röthenbach
- U3: Tiergarten – Aufseßplatz – Steinbühl – Plärrer – Gostenhof – St. Johannis – Thon
- U4: Erlenstegen – Rathenauplatz – Hauptbahnhof – Plärrer – Gostenhof – Schlachthof – Gebersdorf
- U5: Gartenstadt – Steinbühl – Plärrer – Gostenhof – St. Johannis – Wetzendorf

==== Model S ====
In the model "S" all lines run independently of each other and only intersect at the stations Aufseßplatz, Friedrich-Ebert-Platz, Hauptbahnhof, Rathenauplatz, Plärrer, Steinbühl and Schlachthof. The advantage is that there are no shared sections of the route and thus delays on one line would not induce delays on others. As a disadvantage, the frequent need to change trains would make few one-seat-rides possible and make a trip e.g. from Erlenstegen to Zerzabelshof need several changes. The lines would have been as follows in this model:

- U1: Langwasser – Aufseßplatz – Hauptbahnhof – Altstadt – Plärrer – Fürth
- U2: Flughafen – Rathenauplatz – Hauptbahnhof – Plärrer – Schlachthof – Röthenbach
- U3: Gebersdorf – Schlachthof – Steinbühl – Aufseßplatz – Tiergarten
- U4: Thon – Friedrich-Ebert-Platz – Plärrer – Steinbühl – Gartenstadt
- U5: Erlenstegen – Rathenauplatz – Friedrich-Ebert-Platz – Wetzendorf

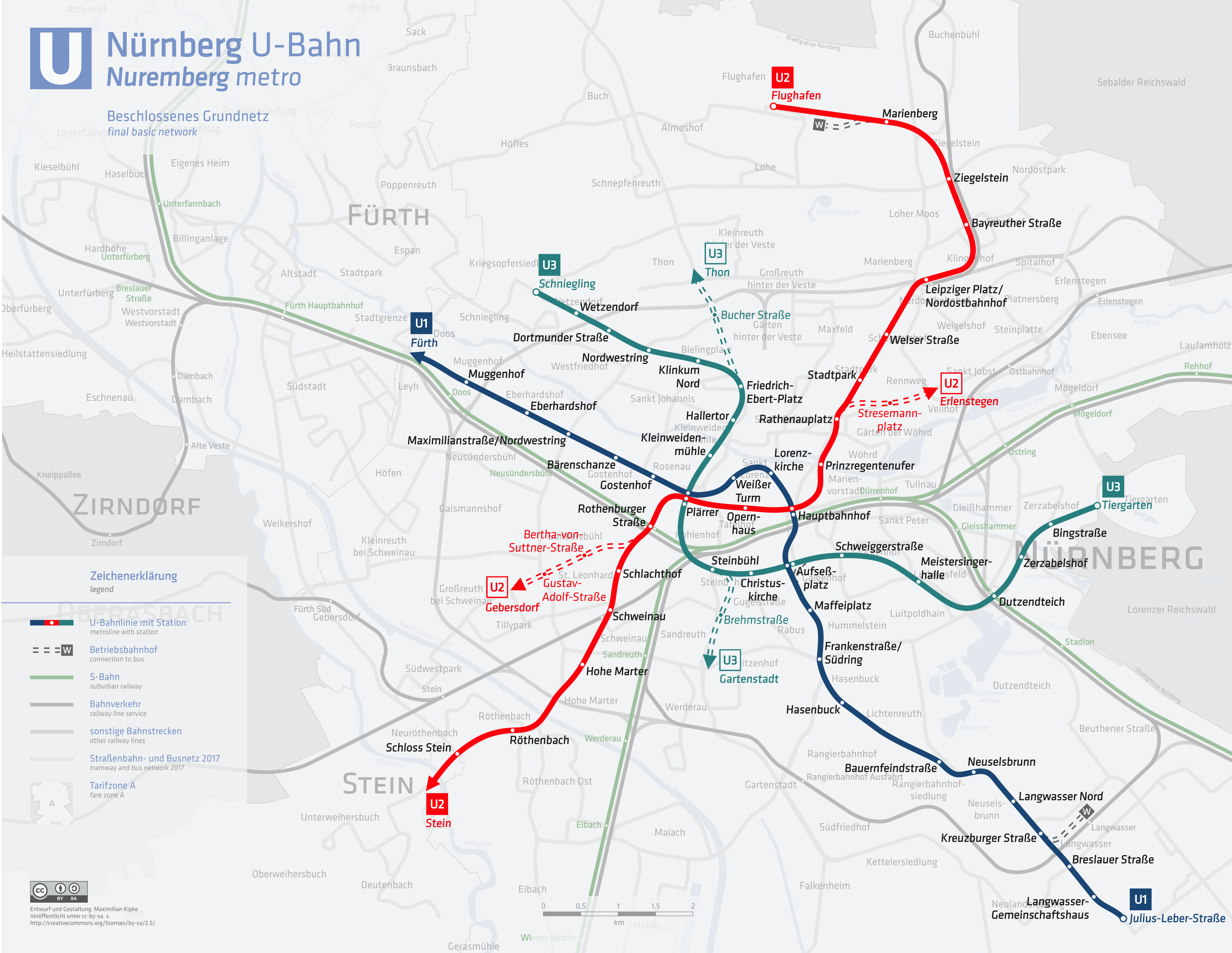
The Master Plan

==== Adopted plan ====
In the end, the model R was deemed to be the most useful of the four models in terms of urban planning, operational engineering and development possibilities. It was slightly modified and formed the basis of the "Nuremberg General Transit Plan" (GNVP) adopted on 8 September 1971 by the City Council. The planned metro network should thereafter consist of the three main lines, out of which the lines U2 and U3 should receive branching possibilities at the stations Friedrich-Ebert-Platz (direction Thon), Rathenauplatz (direction Erlenstegen), Steinbühl (direction Gartenstadt) and Schlachthof (direction Gebersdorf).

- U1: Langwasser – Aufseßplatz – Hauptbahnhof – Altstadt – Plärrer – Fürth
- U2: Stein – Schlachthof – Plärrer – Hauptbahnhof – Rathenauplatz – Flughafen
- U3: Wetzendorf – Friedrich-Ebert-Platz – Plärrer – Steinbühl – Aufseßplatz – Tiergarten

One point of criticism is the insufficient consideration of the territories incorporated into the GNVP on 1 July 1972 (when several suburbs were annexed into Nuremberg in the course of a Bavaria-wide redrawing of municipal boundaries), since metro planning was only slightly adapted to the new settlements.

=== Construction ===
On 20 March 1967, German transport minister Georg Leber and Nuremberg Oberbürgermeister ("Lord Mayor") Andreas Urschlechter (both SPD) had the honour of "striking the first blow" for the new metro. This was done in Bauernfeindstraße when they triggered the pile driver.

On 1 March 1972, the first 3.7-kilometre (2.3 mi) stretch of the system opened, U1 Langwasser Süd to Bauernfeindstraße. An elevated line from Muggenhof station to Stadtgrenze station started construction along with the works on the first stretch of U1 in the Southeast of Nuremberg. This line along Fürther Straße would be used on an interim basis for the Straßenbahn (Tram) from 1970 to 1981 before being opened for the U-Bahn in 1982. Over the next few years, further stretches of U1 were opened. Uniquely, the metro was built "from the outside in", starting in the rather outlying area of Langwasser before reaching the historical core and the central train station. Langwasser was a new housing development with many high-rise buildings assembled from prefabricated parts as was the style in that era. Similar developments in East Germany are known as Plattenbau. When Plärrer station was built, it was built with two sets of tracks above each other and provisions were made for another level of tracks to cross the existing tracks. The former has been in use for U2 (and later U3) ever since those lines opened, whereas the latter has never been fully built up as of 2024. Unlike at Hauptbahnhof where U2/U3 and U1 stop on different levels, at Plärrer there is one track on both levels used for U1 and the other for U2/U3, enabling easier change between trains (Cross-platform interchange). The first subway line reached Fürth Hauptbahnhof in 1985 which would remain its endpoint until 1998. The focus thus shifted to the construction of a second subway line in Nuremberg.

On 28 January 1984, Nuremberg's second U-Bahn line, U2, went into service between Plärrer and Schweinau. This line, too, underwent further extensions, eventually even reaching the airport in 1999 — the last extension of U2 as of 2024. Even during construction, provisions were made for future branching extensions at Rothenburger Straße station and Rathenauplatz station. Those tunnel stubs were indeed used roughly two decades later when what is now U3 was built.

Expansions of the metro were often accompanied with the closure of nearby tram lines, which was initially not opposed by most of the city's population. The original plans of the 1960s had called for the complete abandonment of the tram network if and when the metro was fully built out. However, in the 1990s a change of course became apparent and the decision to shut down the tram network was officially reversed. Nonetheless, in the course of the construction of the northern branch of U3, further shutdowns of trams occurred along Pirckheimerstraße – however, the tracks are still operational for non-revenue movements of trams or in case of interruptions on the rest of the network and it is variously debated to restart revenue service on those tracks.

On 4 December 2004, a new 1.3-kilometre (0.81 mi) section of U1 opened in Fürth, stretching from Stadthalle station to Klinikum station and allowing a further interchange with S1 (Nuremberg S-Bahn), which was extended to serve that station in 2010. On 8 December 2007, U1 was further extended to Fürth Hardhöhe. Those were the last (as of 2024) extensions of U1.

On 14 June 2008, the newest U-Bahn line, U3, opened for service. U3 was first extended in 2011 with Kaulbachplatz and Friedrich Ebert Platz (interchange for Tram line 4) opening on 11 December. U3 was extended again in 2017 with Klinikum Nord and Nordwestring being the latest stations to open on its northern branch on 22 May. The latest station to open was on 15 October 2020, Großreuth bei Schweinau, along the southern branch of U3. Further extensions along the same branch with tentative names "Kleinreuth" and "Gebersdorf" are already planned or under construction.

== Network ==
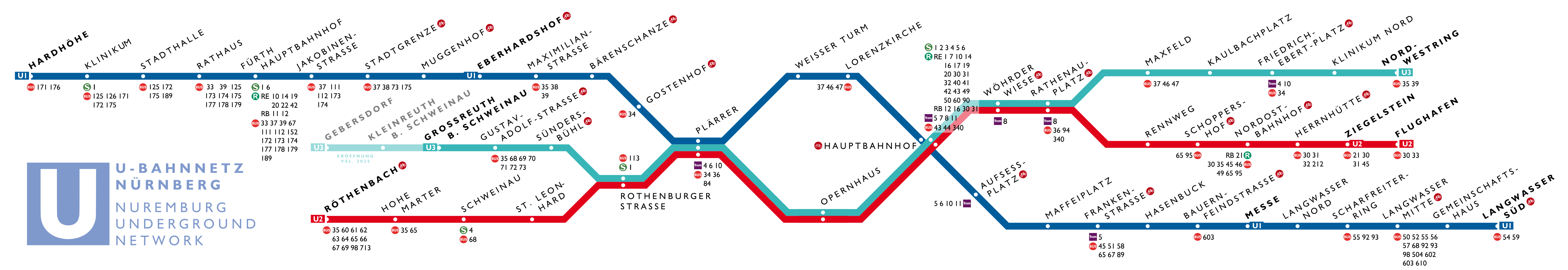
Network diagram as displayed on trains (hence the elongated shape)

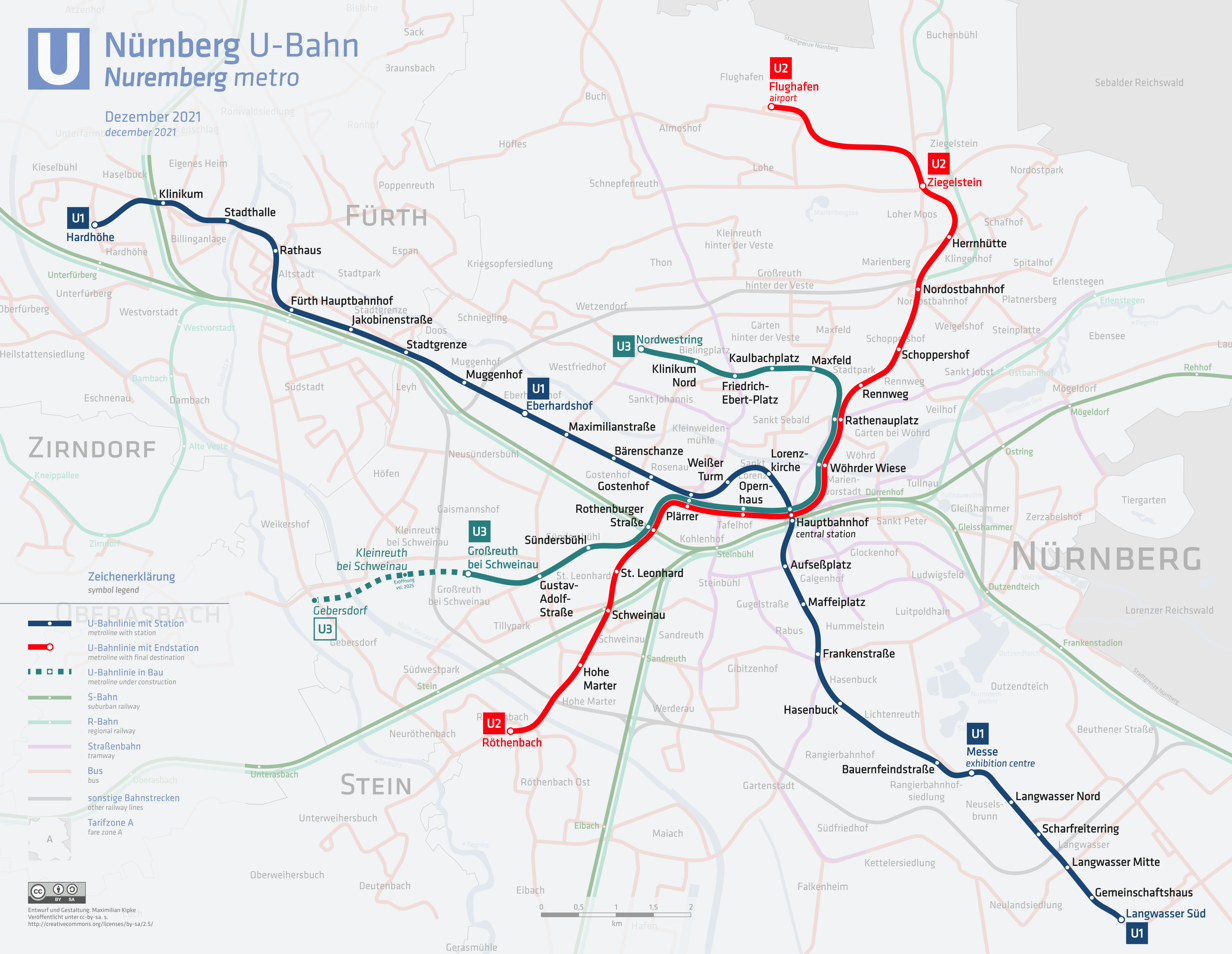
Geographically accurate line map

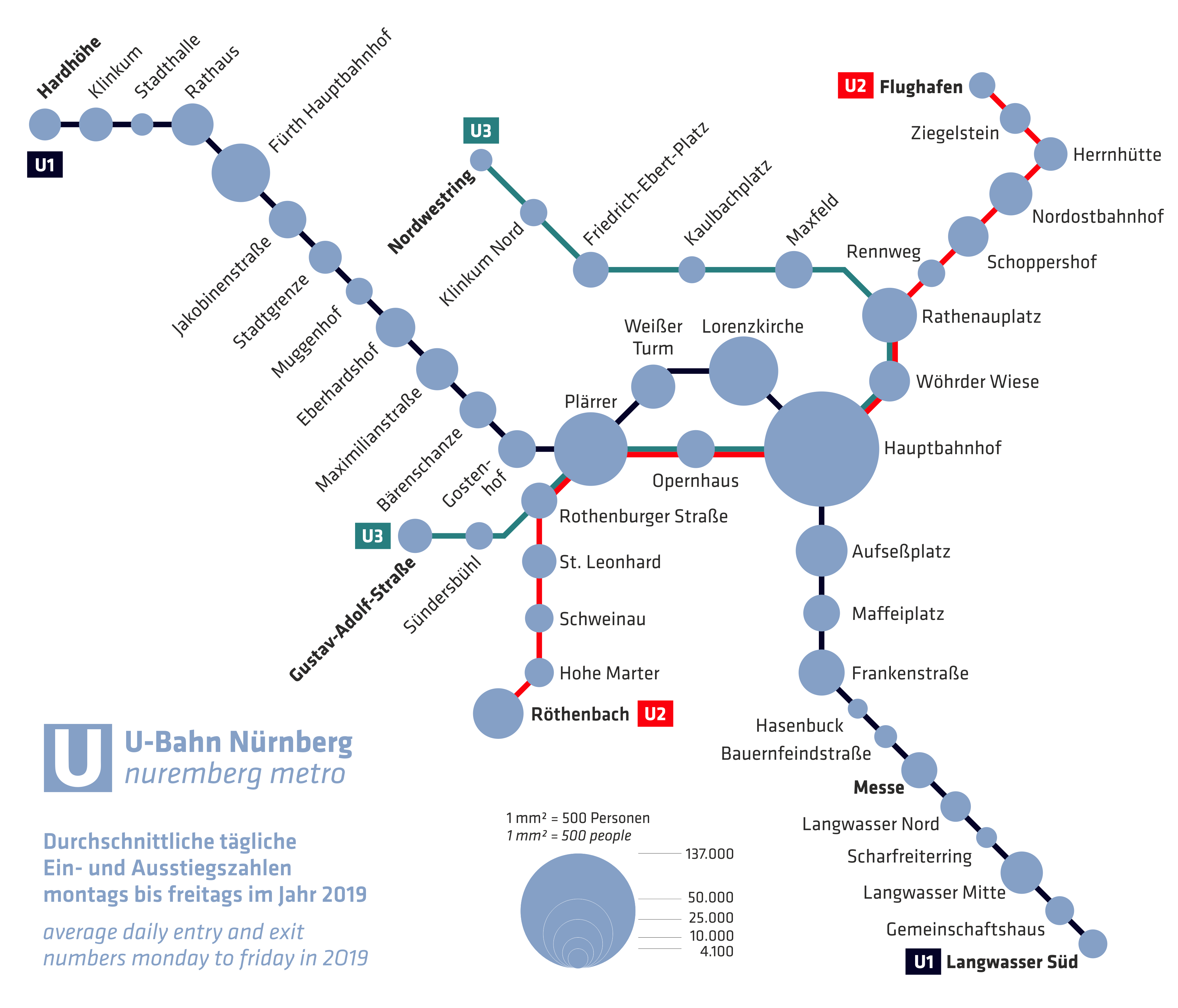
Weekday ridership by station as of 2019 (note that Großreuth station opened in 2020 and is thus not included in this map)

The U-Bahn network comprises three lines, covering about 38 kilometres (24 mi) of network route of which 38 kilometres (24 mi) is operational route. The network serves 49 stations which can all be reached by lift. The system uses "firm tracks" (i.e. rails fastened to a solid trackbed, rather than to sleepers on ballast) in almost all tunnels, although not at Langwasser Mitte (U1) and the adjoining tunnel up to just before Gemeinschaftshaus. Also, ballast is still used on the inbound track, at the entrance to Schoppershof station (U2).

Line	Route	Opened	Length	Stations	Travel time	Average speed	Average distance between stations	Right of way
U1	Fürth Hardhöhe ↔ Langwasser Süd	1972–2007	18.5 km (11.5 mi)	27	35 min	31.7 km/h (19.7 mph)	711 m (2,333 ft)	tunnel / at grade / elevated
U2	Flughafen/Airport ↔ Röthenbach	1984–1999	13.2 km (8.2 mi)	16	22 min	36.0 km/h (22.4 mph)	880 m (2,890 ft)	tunnel
U3	Großreuth ↔ Nordwestring	2008–2020	9.2 km (5.7 mi)	14	19 min	29.0 km/h (18.0 mph)	708 m (2,323 ft)	tunnel

=== U1 ===
Fürth Hardhöhe ←→ Langwasser Süd

Within Fürth there are seven U-Bahn stations: Stadtgrenze (partly within Nuremberg, partly within Fürth – indeed the station's name means "city boundary" – but assigned to and run by Nuremberg), Jakobinenstraße, Fürth Hauptbahnhof, Rathaus, Stadthalle, Klinikum and Hardhöhe. U1 is the oldest line of the system, the longest line and the only one to cross the city boundary.

Between Nuremberg Plärrer and Fürth Hauptbahnhof it reuses parts of the right of way of the Bavarian Ludwig Railway, which operated there between 1835 and 1922. Afterwards the route was operated as an express tram between 1927 and 1981, when it was converted to metro.

Since 2010 it has been the only line in the system to be driver-operated. Some portions of U1 are above ground and exposed to the outdoor elements. The motion detection system fitted to the U2/U3 lines cannot be used as the outdoor elements can trigger a false alarm. That is: when an object falls on the tracks, the system "thinks" it is a human or animal on the tracks and triggers the emergency brake. Similar issues in the past plagued Opernhaus station on U2/U3 as birds often fly in from the side of the tracks open to the moat.

=== U2 ===
Nuremberg Airport ←→ Röthenbach

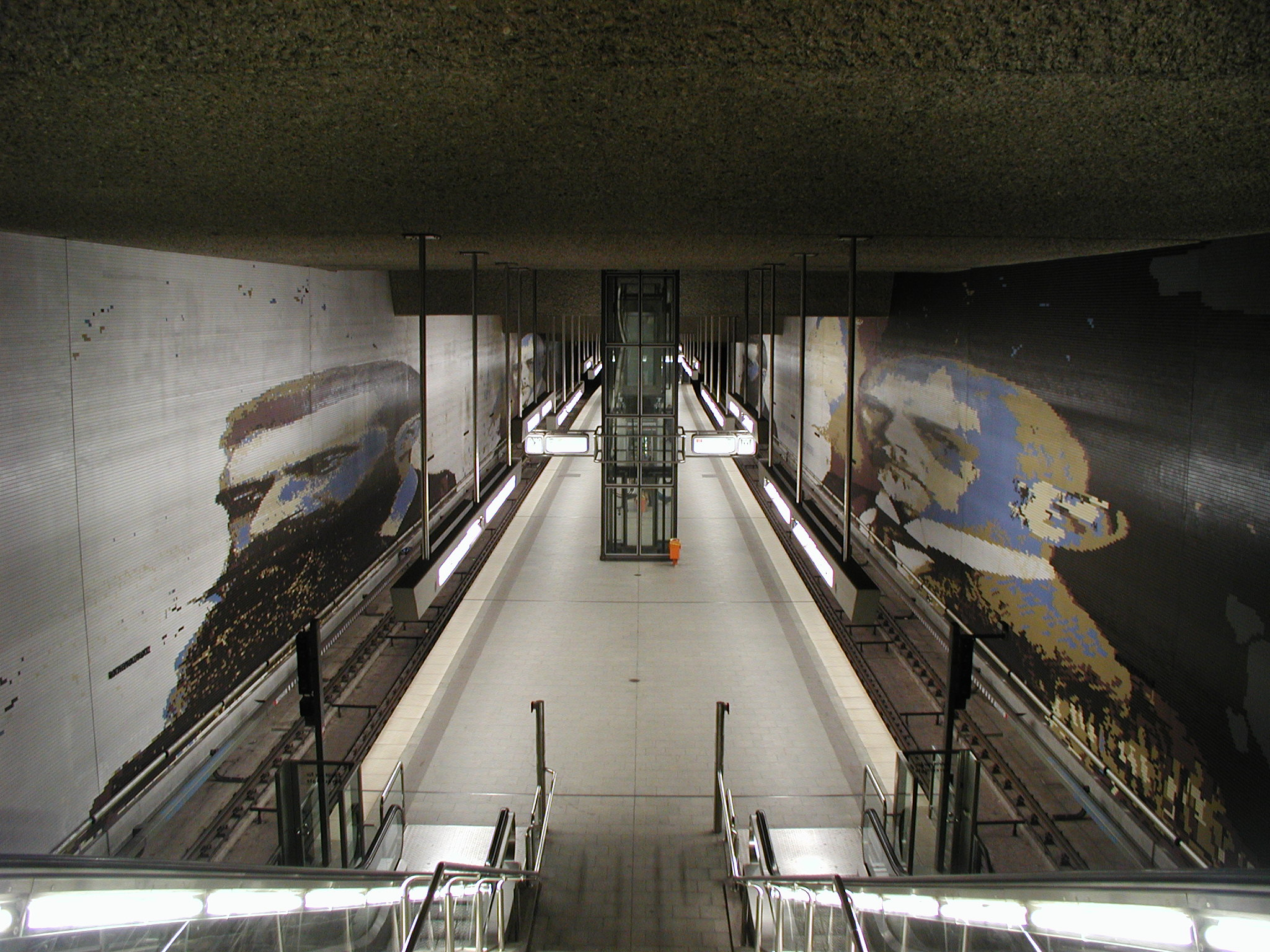
Rathenauplatz

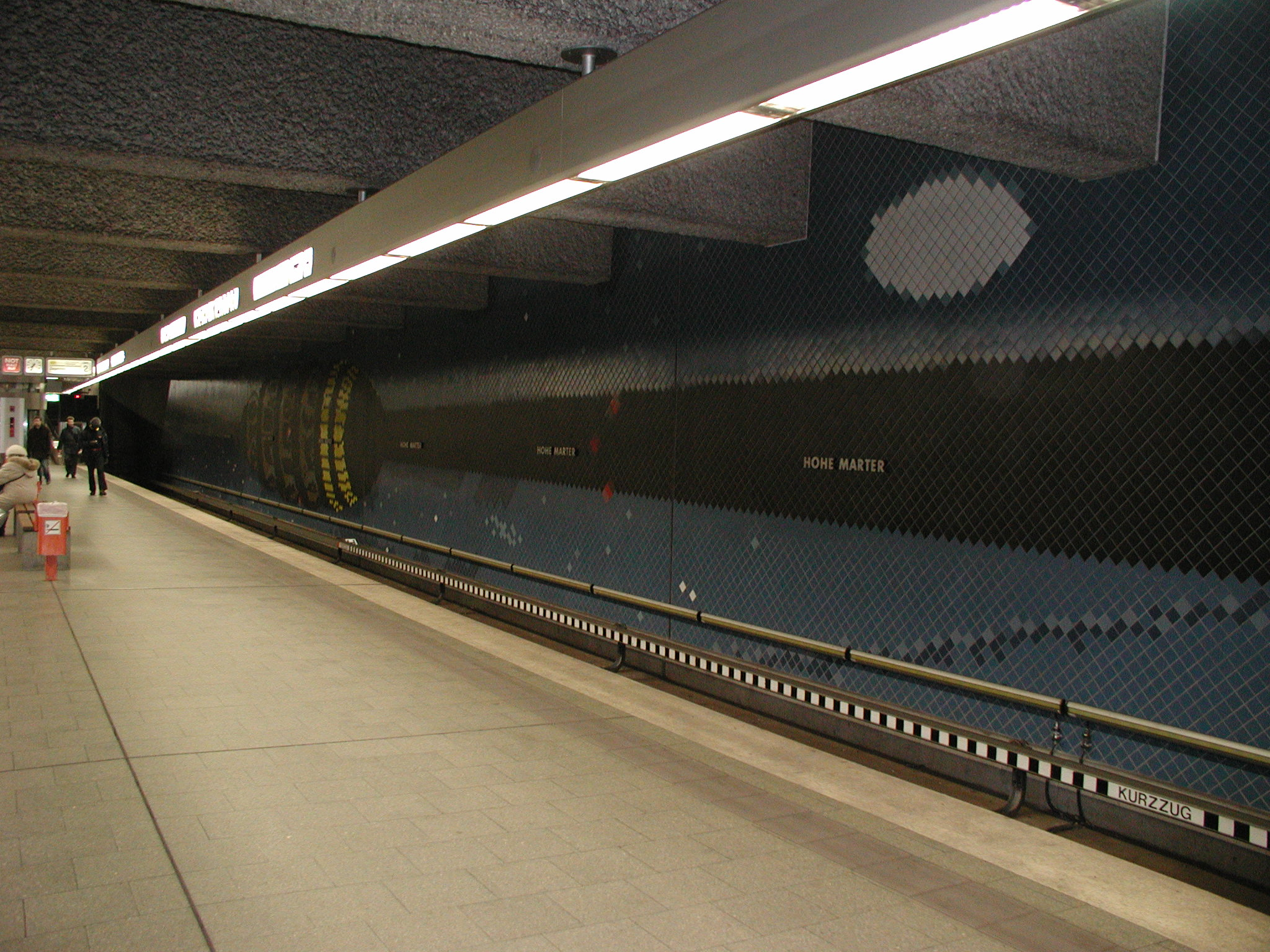
Hohe Marter

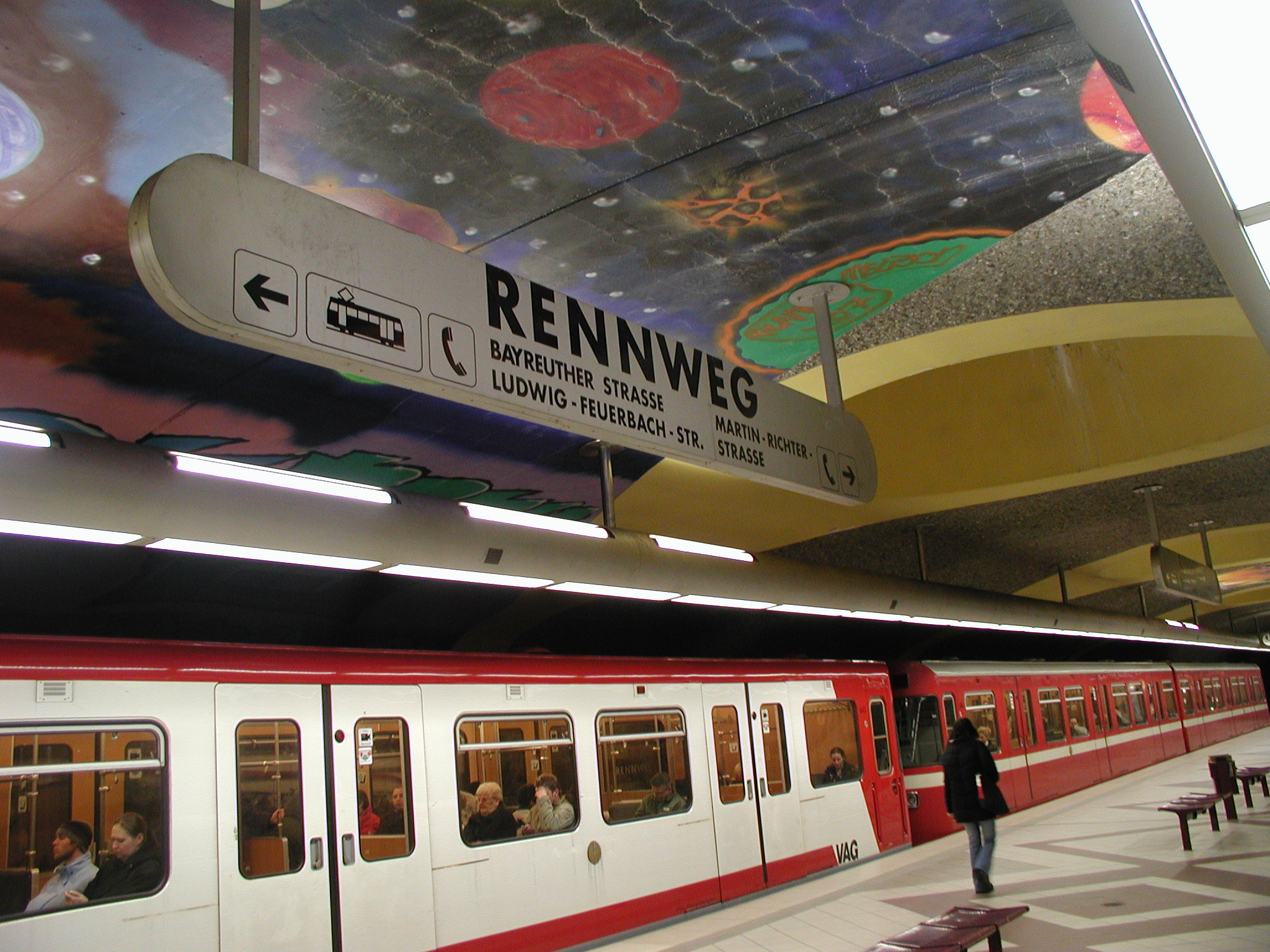
Rennweg

In 1984, a new section on the line U2 named Plärrer–Schweinau began operation. At first the trains ran by day as line U21 (not to be confused with the later U21) by way of Weißer Turm and Lorenzkirche to Aufseßplatz or Langwasser Süd. Since 1988, the line has run as U2 by way of Opernhaus to Hauptbahnhof (Nuremberg Main Railway Station). After further extensions in 1990, 1993 and 1996, U2 reached its current terminus at the airport in 1999.

In September 2009 the first driverless trains ran in passenger service on line U2. Four out of the eight trains in service on the line moved to automatic control, with the aim of full automation by January 2010. A goal which was met on January 2 of 2010.

=== U3 ===
Großreuth ←→ Nordwestring

The latest U-Bahn line, U3, was opened on 14 June 2008. This line uses the U2 tunnel between Rathenauplatz and Rothenburger Straße and diverts north of Rathenauplatz to the northwest and south of Rothenburger Straße to the southwest of Nuremberg. The U3 line has fully automatic operation without drivers.

Each of the stations along U3 route has tubes resembling yellow fluorescent light tubes running the length of the platform. These tubes emit radar waves and monitor the track for any fallen obstacles. If an object or person falls into the track, automatic brakes on trains are triggered.

On 30 October 2008, the first accident resulting in a death occurred at Rathenauplatz station. A passenger fell onto the track as a driverless train approached the platform. The train was unable to halt in time because of the short distance to the fallen passenger and limitations of its braking system. Even if the same incident had occurred with a manually operated train, the driver would not have been able to halt in time either.

The U3 line was extended from Maxfeld to Kaulbachplatz and Friedrich-Ebert-Platz stations on 11 December 2011. The further extension to Klinikum Nord and Nordwestring stations started service to the new terminus station on 22 May 2017. The southern extension towards Großreuth opened in October 2020. Further extensions towards Gebersdorf are under construction along the Southern end of the line and already shown with dashed lines or a lighter color on official schedules and network plans.

=== Former services ===
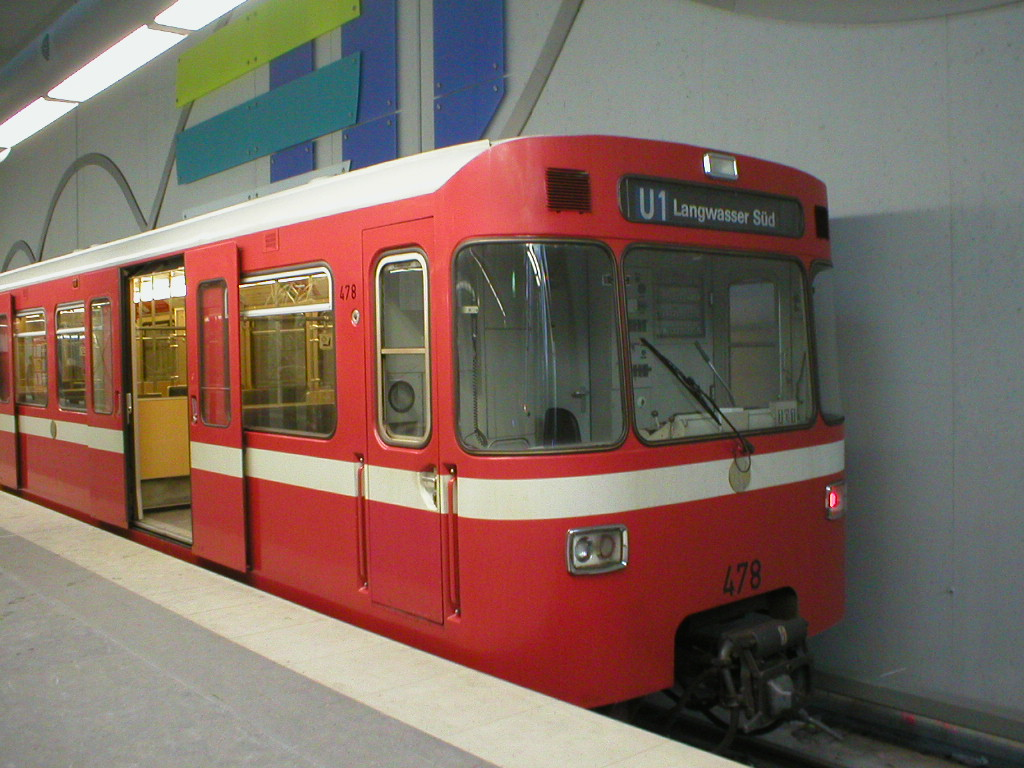
Nuremberg U-Bahn train type DT1

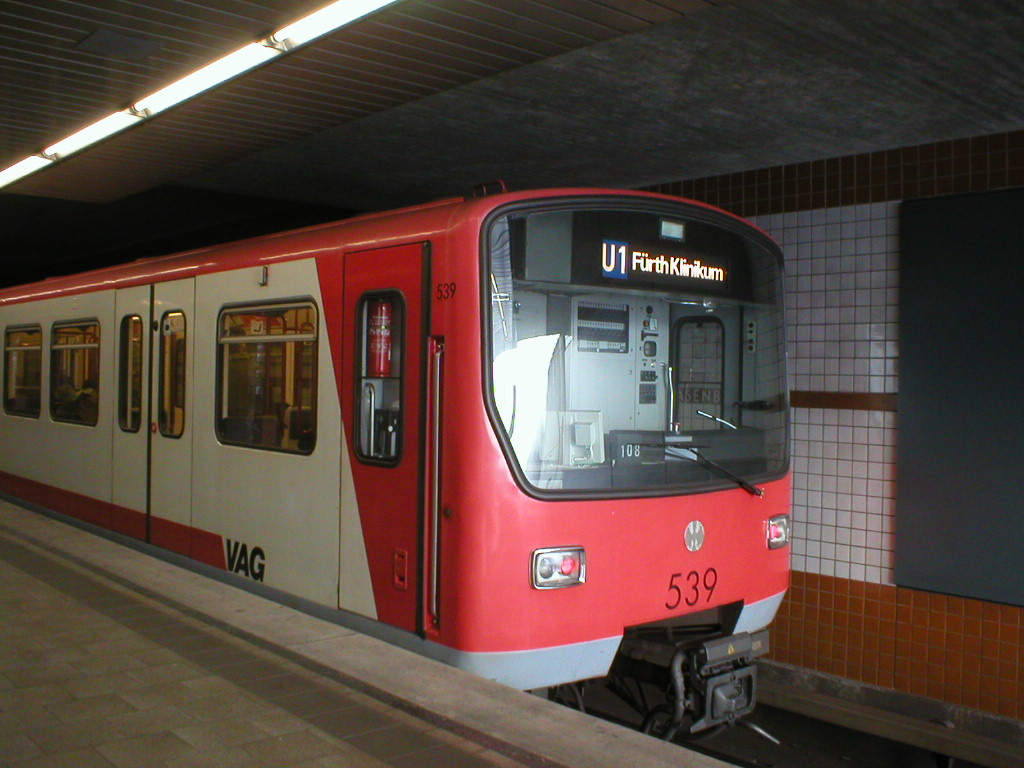
Nuremberg U-Bahn train type DT2

To increase passenger capacity on the central parts of the metro, additional trains were scheduled which reversed before the line terminus and ran through only the central areas of Nuremberg. While those shorter runs still operate, they are no longer differentiated by line number but only by the display of their final destination (e.g. a train that would have been signed "U21" prior to 2017 is now simply an U2 direction "Ziegelstein")

Line	Route	Opened	Length	Stations	Service ended
U11	Eberhardshof ↔ Messe	1972–2007	8.1 km (5.033 mi)	14	2017
U21	Röthenbach → Ziegelstein	1984–1999	11.0 km (6.835 mi)	15	2017

==== U11 ====
Eberhardshof ↔ Messe

U11 service ran on the U1 line between Eberhardshof and Messe most of the day, adding passenger capacity between Nuremberg main station, the car-free main shopping district and the Plärrer.

==== U21 ====
Röthenbach → Ziegelstein

U21 trains ran only from Röthenbach to Ziegelstein on the U2 line. Since the single-track tunnel between Ziegelstein and Flughafen (Airport) could only accommodate a train frequency of 400 seconds at the time (or roughly one train every 6 2/3 minutes), only every second train during the day ran to the airport, while the other trains reversed at Ziegelstein. On their way back all trains were designated as U2 since they all run to Röthenbach, and their origin – Ziegelstein or Flughafen – was meaningless to passengers. U2 trains terminating at Ziegelstein are still operated but signaled as U2 to passengers.

== Further extensions ==
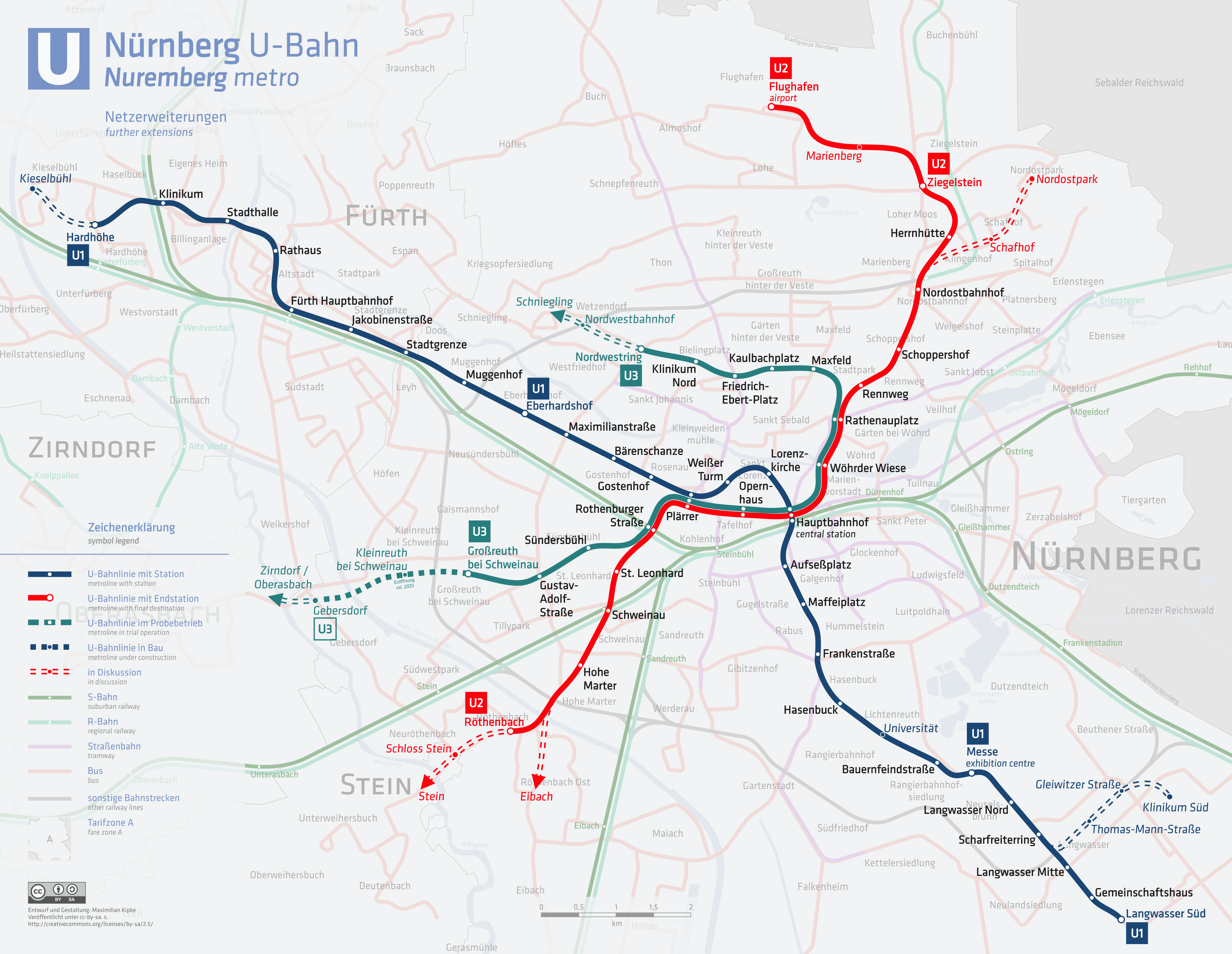
Possible further extensions

In 2020 press coverage called into question any extensions beyond the section of U3 to Gebersdorf already under construction and scheduled to open in 2027.

=== U1 ===
Fürth Kieselbühl

With Fürth Hardhöhe station, the U1 has reached its provisional terminus after 40 years. Whether Fürth Kieselbühl station, northwest of Hardhöhe, is still to be built depends mainly on the financial power of the city of Fürth and on the development of this district. The area is designated in the land use plan as a commercial area. If the area were to be developed in the future, an extension of the metro could take place in connection with the construction of a park-and-ride facility. However, the city of Fürth has rejected various plans for developing the area currently filled with home supply and grocery stores.

Nuremberg University

With the decision in 2017 that Nuremberg should become a university city, policy planning for a metro station University was determined. The metro stop is projected in the Brunecker Straße industrial area, between Hasenbuck and Bauernfeindstraße stations, where the university and the new urban quarter of Lichtenreuth are planned.

Branch Scharfreiterring

Further discussion refers to a possible branch of the metro from Scharfreiterring station to Klinikum Nürnberg-Süd. Intermediate stops could possibly be Thomas-Mann-Straße and Gleiwitzer Straße.

=== U2 ===
With the route to the airport/Flughafen station in use, the part of the U2 within Nuremberg has been completed. A possible extension towards the new tram terminus "Am Wegfeld" is not deemed sensible.

Marienberg

When the extension from Ziegelstein to the airport was built, provisions were made for a future infill station at Marienberg to serve a potential new commercial and/or housing development. The section between Ziegelstein and Airport is by far the longest stretch between two stops in the entire network.

Branch northeast station (Nordostbahnhof)

To better serve the industrial development at Nordostpark (currently only served by buses) a branch of U2 eastward from Nordostbahnhof has been proposed.

Branch Hohe Marter

Another proposal for a branch off of U2 would branch at the second to last stop in the southerly direction, Hohe Marter, in a roughly southeasterly direction toward the neighborhood of Eibach. While Eibach is already served by the S-Bahn, the stop is out of the way of most development. Further extensions of such a branch towards Reichelsdorf have thus far failed to reach a benefit cost ratio above 1.0 and are thus unlikely to get the federal money that is widely seen as precondition for construction.

=== U3 Nord (Northern branch) ===
The northern branch (U3 Nord) diverts from the U2 tunnel north of Rathenauplatz to run west under the northern quarters of Nuremberg. This branch consists of 5 stations, of which three stations (Maxfeld, Kaulbachplatz and Friedrich-Ebert-Platz) have been completed until December 2011. The last two stations (Klinikum Nord and the terminus station Nordwestring) have been completed in December 2016 and were opened for service in May 2017, thus completing this branch. In 2018, the local SPD proposed to extend the U3 to a proposed housing project in Wetzendorf. However, a subsequent study showed that it was extremely unlikely such an extension would achieve a benefit cost quotient anywhere near 1.0.

=== U3 Süd (Southern branch) ===
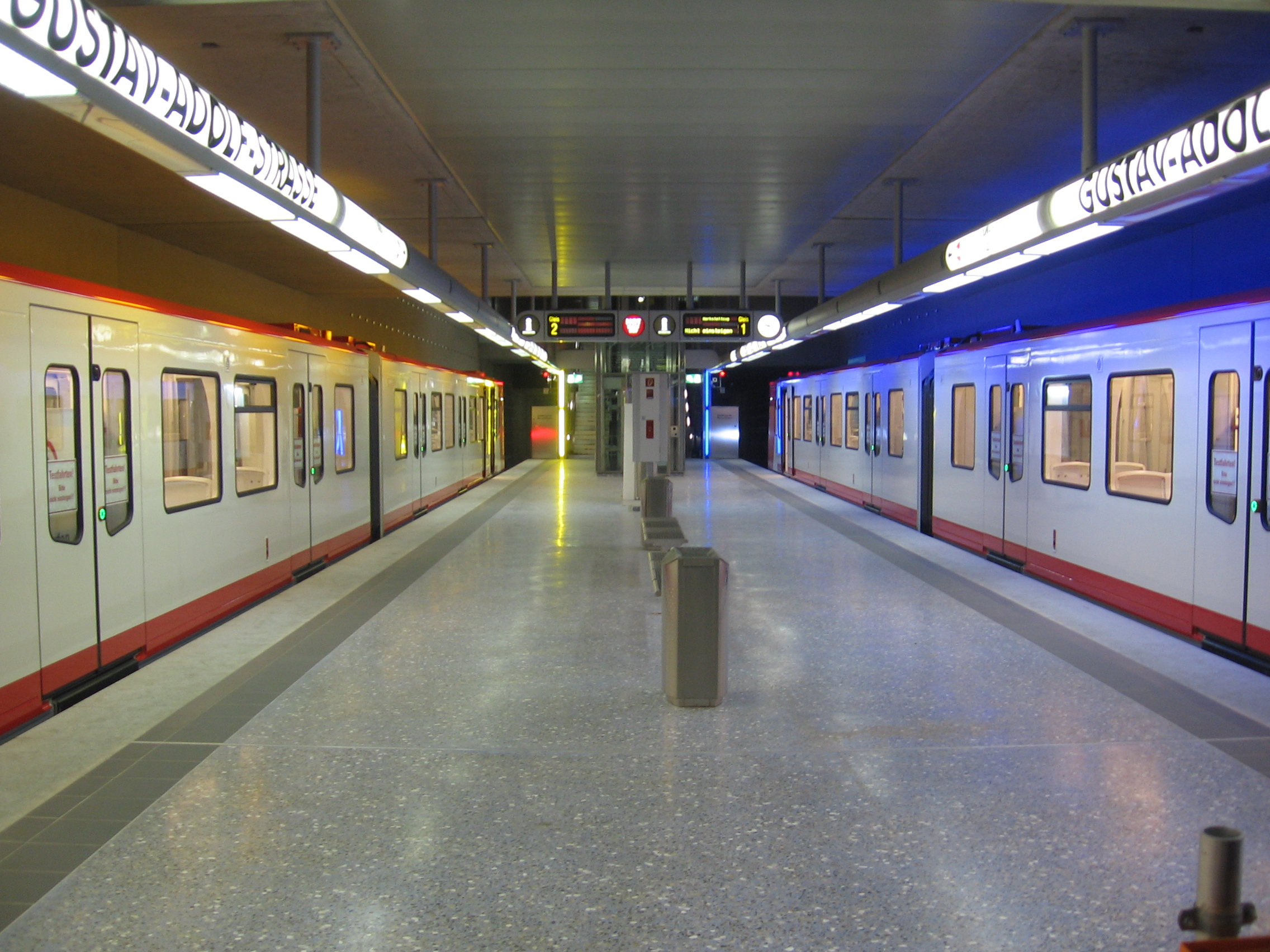
Station Gustav-Adolf-Straße with DT3 units at the platform

The southern branch (U3 Süd) diverts from the U2 tunnel south of Rothenburger Straße and runs to the west as well. Three stations of this branch (Sündersbühl, Gustav-Adolf-Straße and Großreuth) have been completed. The terminus of this branch, to be opened around 2027 or later, will be Gebersdorf near the former station Fürth Süd of the abandoned Bibertbahn railway at a busy street intersection south of Fürth's city limits. Further expansion beyond that is under consideration on the right of way of the abandoned Bibertbahn railway into Zirndorf and possibly beyond. A new station called "Großreuth bei Schweinau" started service on 15 October 2020 marking the latest extension of the network. Further extensions are planned along this branch with construction already underway for a new station "Kleinreuth" and a further station tentatively called "Gebersdorf" planned roughly at the site of the former "Fürth Süd" station along the abandoned de:Bibertbahn.

=== Possible U4 ===
Since the earliest plans (see above) called for more than two fully fledged "main lines" with two branches (U3 South and North) branching from them, there have been discussions of a third "main line" or another branch similar to U3. However, the financial situation of Nuremberg would only allow for such a line to be constructed with federal or state funds. Federal funds are conditional on a "benefit cost quotient" which is calculated according to standardized measures and has to reach a value above 1.0 (i.e. "benefits" need to exceed "costs") and thus far (2020) most proposals have not reached this threshold. In general the local CSU has been in favor of a new U4 whereas the SPD and the Greens tended to be more skeptical about new metro construction. As Nuremberg has had a SPD mayor for most of its postwar history – excepting the 1996–2002 period in office of Ludwig Scholz (CSU) and the period during which Andreas Urschlechter (formerly SPD) ran as an independent – the debate about a new U4 has been mostly theoretical. However, in the 2020 municipal elections the office of Lord Mayor was won by CSU-candidate Marcus König who had campaigned on the promise of metro extensions. Which route such a metro would take is not entirely clear, but proposals to serve Zerzabelshof ("Zabo") are among the more frequent ones.

=== Extensions to the Landkreis Fürth ===
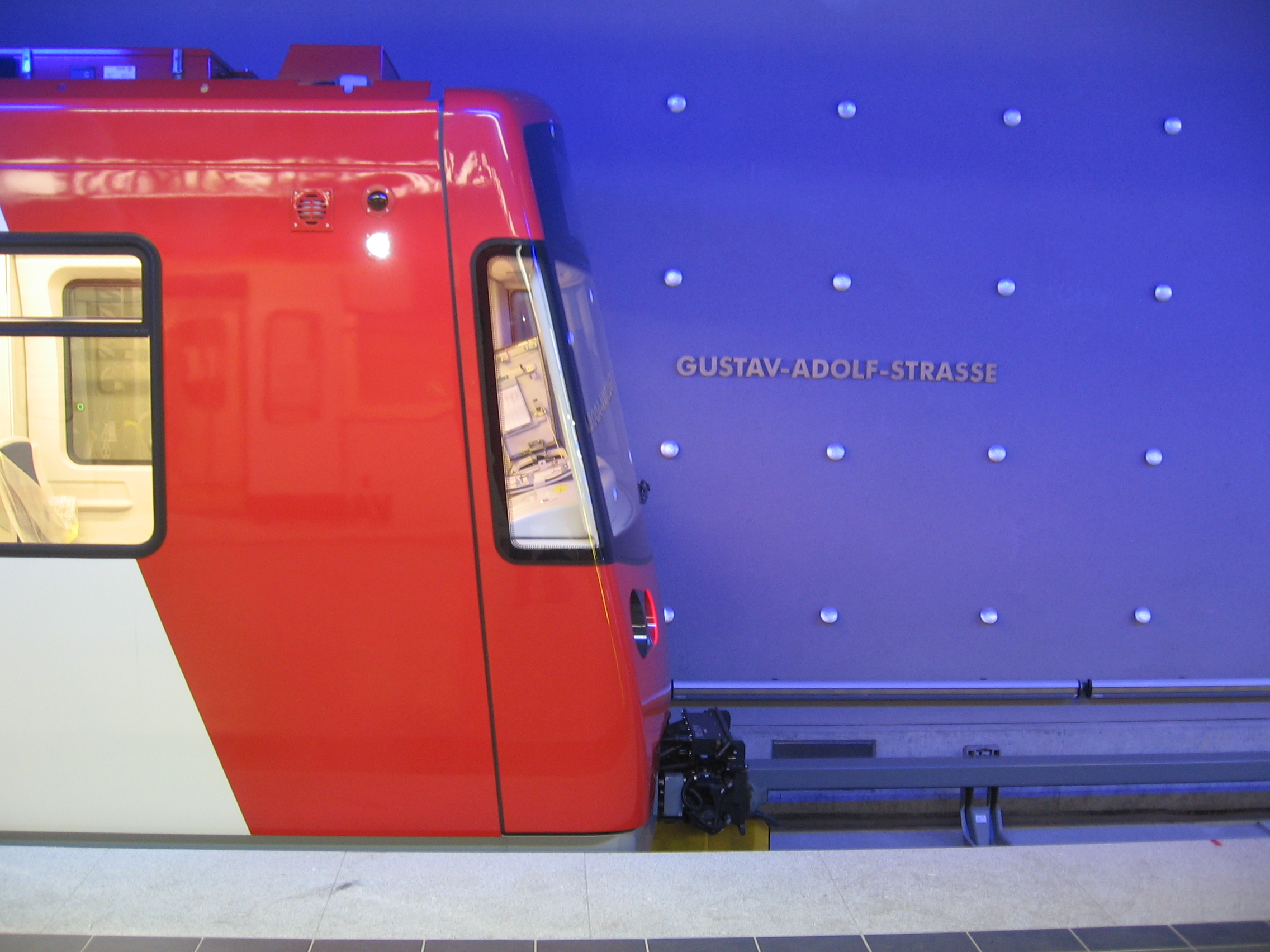
Nuremberg U-Bahn train type DT3-F

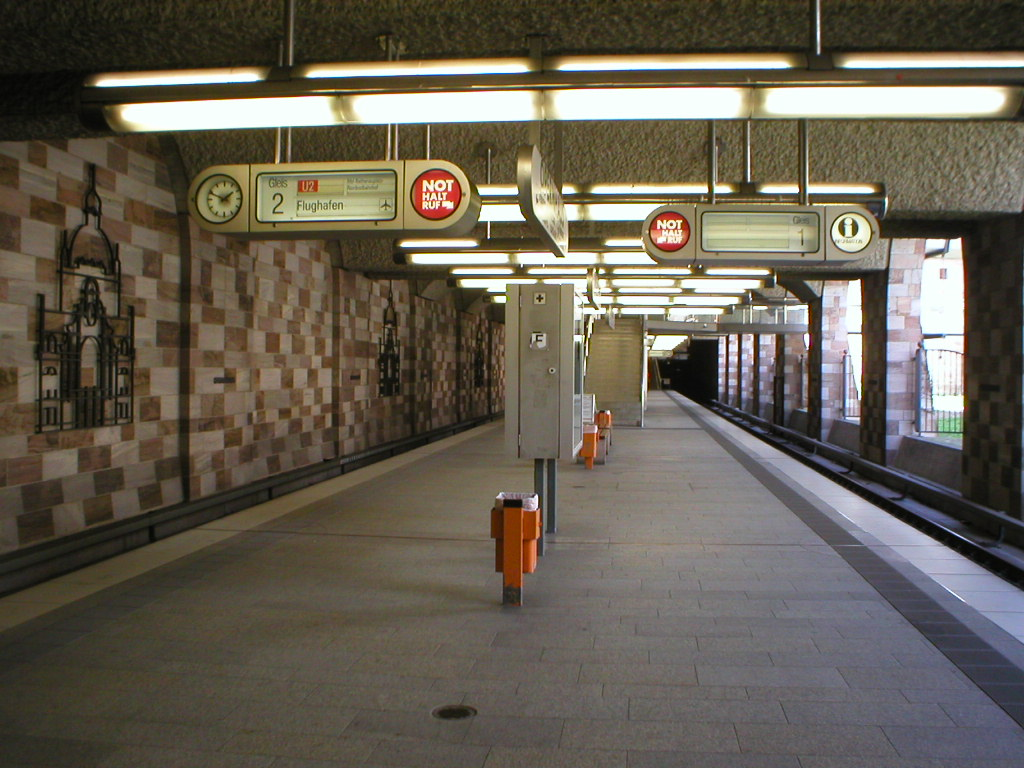
U-Bahn station Opernhaus

Possible extensions to the U2 and U3 are currently in competition with each other. For cost reasons, only one of the two projects will be implemented.

The current southern terminus of U2, Röthenbach, is by far the busiest in the network and as it is served by both a large P&R multistory carpark (shut down in 2020 and subsequently demolished) and several bus lines, the question of extending the line to serve those currently using the buses and the parking garage has come up repeatedly since the opening of the station in 1986. Extension of the U2 from Röthenbach to Stein was part of the network plans dating from the 1970s. A profitability study from 1994 reported a cost-benefit factor of 0.33, thus not reaching the target of at least 1 that was required for funding, although that study examined only the subsection from Röthenbach to the planned end point in Deutenbach. In 1997, the Zweckverband Verkehrsverbund Greater Nuremberg (ZVGN) commissioned the engineering firm Intraplan Consult to carry out another study, this time for the section from Nuremberg Hauptbahnhof to Deutenbach. This study yielded a cost-benefit factor of 1.7 at an estimated total construction cost of 159.01 million euros (311 million D-Mark). On that basis, the extension of the U2 was decided by the Nuremberg City Council. The Stein authorities were also in favour of the construction, in order to reduce traffic on the B14 road, but could not afford their share of the construction costs (over 1 million D-Mark) and the operating costs. The automation of the U2, which has been completed in 2010, would provide a new opportunity for extension to the neighboring city, which both cities are still interested in. With this in mind, ZVGN prepared a new study to investigate the impact of automatic operation on operating and maintenance costs. After the U3 extension to Zirndorf was rejected by referendum, the mayor of Stein, Kurt Krömer, called for a rapid investigation of the U2 extension parallel to the remaining U3 extension in the direction of Oberasbach / Leichendorf, to avoid missing the opportunity of obtaining subsidies under the Municipal Transport Financing Act that would expire in 2013.

When the results of the study were presented on 23 September 2013, however, the conclusion was that the chances of a benefit-cost indicator of at least +1.0 were small.

In 2013, the plans for the extension to Stein were shelved by the traffic committee of the Fürth rural district council. There was criticism because the profitability study examined only the new section from Stein to Röthenbach, not up to Plärrer in Nuremberg.

Current political planning includes only one additional station, "Schloss Stein " (Stein Castle).

In the press conference held on 23 March 2010 it was announced that there would be no extension of the U3 to Oberasbach. According to the report, neither of the two alternatives (a tunnel under the Rothenburger Straße to Oberasbach Süd with a cost-benefit factor of 0.44 or an above-ground route following the old Bibertbahn railway to Oberasbach Nord with a negative cost-benefit factor of −0.04) achieved the legally required 1.0.

== Rolling stock ==
The Nuremberg U-Bahn currently uses two classes of trains. Its former DT1 vehicles are largely the same design as the A cars found on the Munich U-Bahn, and both transport companies once lent each other trainsets as reserve rolling stock for major events (such as the Munich Olympics) at the time when both systems were quite new. Such swaps are now no longer possible, as the rolling stock on each system have developed in ways that would require modification for use on the other system. The newer Nuremberg trains (the DT3, for example) are incompatible with the Munich system. While A cars are still in use in Munich, the DT1 was withdrawn from service in Nuremberg in 2023. Two units (forming one train) are to be preserved as heritage vehicles. The DT2 which was last used during the 50 year anniversary celebrations of the network in 2022 is to be scrapped entirely due to lack of space to store any preserved units. Especially the DT1 was sometimes called "Pegnitzpfeil" by local media reports. The Pegnitz is a river that runs through Nuremberg, while "Pfeil" is the German word for "arrow".

In 2004, 6 Munich A cars were bought by VAG to supplement its own rolling stock fleet. However, owing to the divergence in specifications between the Nuremberg and Munich systems, it turned out that the old Munich stock could not be coupled with Nuremberg stock. As a result, it was not possible to compose trains using both types, although they can at least run on the same tracks. VAG left the Munich stock in its old white and blue Munich livery, reasoning that it was not worth repainting in Nuremberg livery, given that it was approaching the end of its service life.

=== Previous rolling stock ===
- VAG Class DT1 (built between 1970 and 1984, in service until 2023) – 64 built, two units (four cars) have been retained by VAG for preservation. One unit was sold for preservation to a private association.
- VAG Class DT2 (built between 1993 and 1994, in service until 2022) – 12 built
- MVG Class A - in use intermittently until 2009 (sometimes on loan basis) some units still in use in Munich

=== Current rolling stock ===
- VAG Class DT3 (built between 2004 and 2011) – the DT3 exists in a version with (DT3F) and without a driver cab. Of the former 14 units are in use, of the latter 35 are
- VAG Class G1 (under construction since 2017, in service since 2019) – 35 units in use (due to them being 4-car-trains, this is equivalent to 70 DT of earlier generations)

== ATC and driverless trains ==
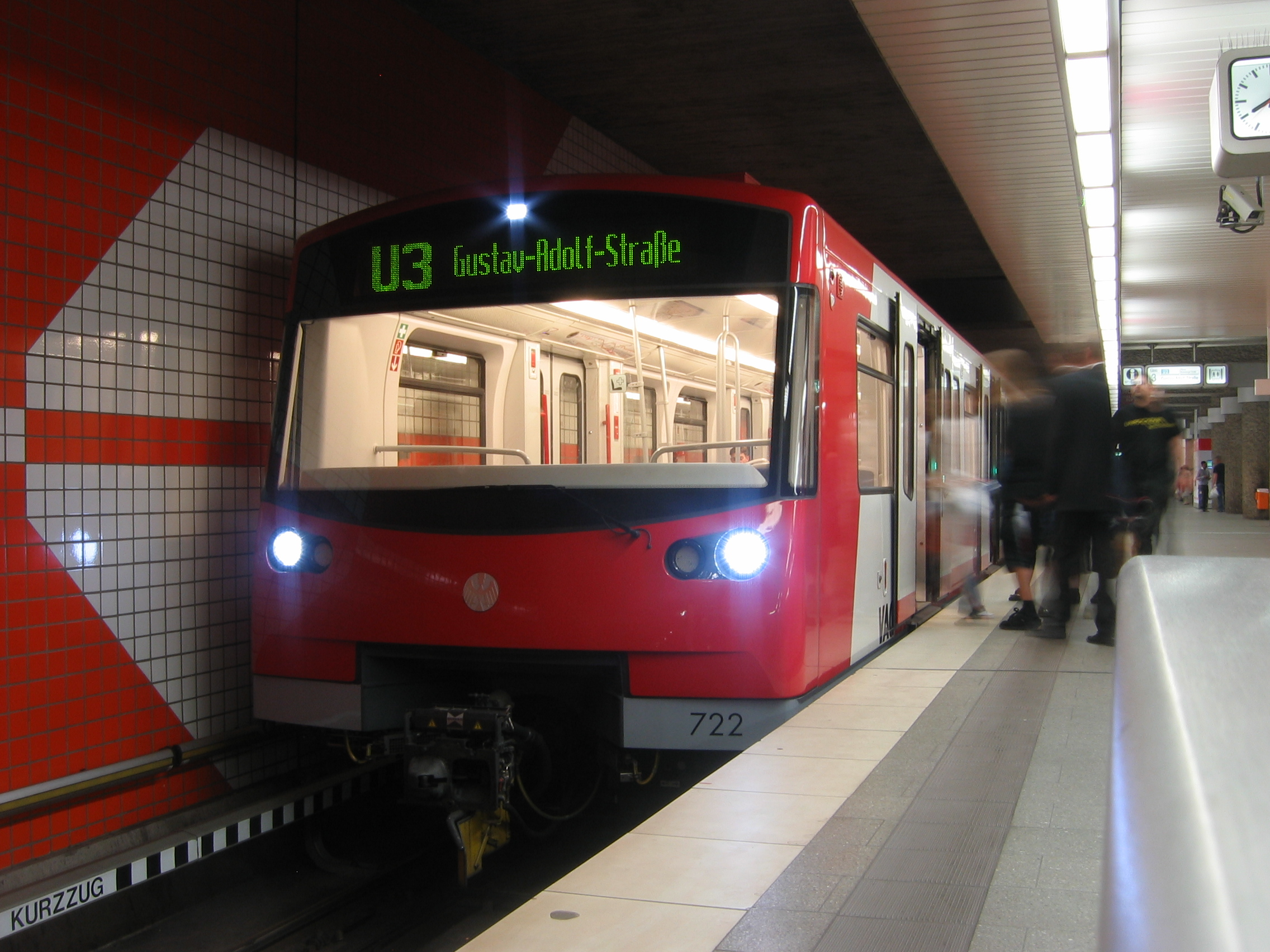
DT3 train set

The ATC system is derived from Deutsche Bahn's Linienzugbeeinflussung (LZB), with additional parts added for door control and other safety systems. It works by transmitting data from the train to the interlocking station through two cables installed in the track between the rails. About one year after the U3 line has entered service, it is intended to convert U2 line to full ATC operations; however, during the first year there will be mixed traffic of ATC-run driverless DT3 units on U3 courses and conventionally run DT1 and DT2 units on U2 and U21 courses between Rathenauplatz and Rothenburger Straße. This has not been done anywhere before and therefore the ATC system had to be specifically designed and developed to allow for this mixed operation mode. All train operations will be automated, including normal operation, coupling and uncoupling of two DT3 units in storage tracks as well as at platforms, moving trains from and to storage tracks as well as reversing trains at platforms and in storage tracks.

Day-to-day operations will be handled rather like those of Docklands Light Railway, with service employees riding in some trains to watch out for disruptive passengers and unusual occurrences and to supply information to passengers. Unlike the DLR however, not every train will be accompanied by a service employee, and again unlike the DLR, service employees have no task in the actual operation of the train. Hence the grade of automation is mixed between GoA 3 – Driverless, and GoA 4 – Unattended Train Operation (UTO). Doors close automatically, supervised by light barriers and pressure-sensitive door edges. Only in the case of service disruptions will a service employee take over the task of driving the train. For this purpose, all service employees are fully trained drivers.

There were many reasons for choosing an automated, driverless system:

- First was the demand to reduce operation cost by eliminating the driver. There will be no layoffs even after the full conversion of the U2 line to ATC operations, since existing drivers will be trained as service employees, but no new personnel will be hired for the operation of the new line. VAG expects to improve line safety and passenger satisfaction by this change, since former drivers who were behind a door and busy with the operation of the train are now becoming service employees. They now become available to passengers inside the carriages and on platforms to look out for disruptions and possible crime, thus increasing the subjective security, and to supply information and answer questions, helping passengers find their way.
- Another reason was the improved capacity of the U2 tunnel that was needed to accommodate the U3 traffic. Current metro lines in Nuremberg are built for a train frequency of 200 seconds or 3 1/3 minutes (sole exception: Ziegelstein-Flughafen: 400 seconds), which is already fully used on the U1 during the day and on the U2 during morning rush hour. With the new ATC system in place, additional (virtual) blocks will exist between stationary block signals, thus increasing line capacity to a train frequency of 100 seconds. However, these new blocks can only be used by ATC-operated trains since they are virtual and have no stationary signal associated with them that can be observed by a driver-operated train without ATC equipment. Thus the increased line capacity can only be effectively used after the U2 has been converted to full ATC operation.
- For the creation of a new ATC system accommodating mixed ATC and non-ATC traffic federal grants and subsidies were awarded, offsetting some of the additional cost.
- ATC-controlled trains in storage tracks can be activated instantly, making it possible for the line controller to put additional trains into passenger service at a moment's notice when they observe an unexpected increase in passenger numbers.

=== Passenger safety ===
All DT3 units are equipped with passenger intercom panels near every door in addition to the standard emergency brakes and emergency door release handles. Controllers can access CCTV cameras in every unit from the control centre through a Wireless LAN link installed in all tunnels that are used by DT3 trains. Flame-retardant materials are used wherever possible. Temperature sensors and smoke detectors are spread throughout every unit in the passenger space and in every underfloor machinery compartment to detect possible fires as early as possible. Circuit integrity retaining electrical cables (cables that can keep their insulation for a certain time in the presence of fire) are used to allow a unit to proceed to the next station in case of a fire. German regulations mandate that metro trains must not stop inside a tunnel after the emergency brake has been pulled or if any other hazard like a fire is detected, but instead should proceed to the next station if possible, to ease rescue operations. Since the longest travel time between two stations on the Nuremberg U-Bahn is about 3 minutes (between Ziegelstein and Flughafen) and most stations are less than 60 seconds apart, this is deemed a superior option to stopping inside a tunnel, where evacuation, rescue and firefighting attempts would be much more difficult than on a station platform.

German regulations mandate some means to stop a train if a person or large object should fall onto the track. Installing doors between track and platform (as on Paris's Météor Line) would have been the superior solution, but since 6 stations which were already in full operation (the section Rathenauplatz to Rothenburger Straße) would have needed to be converted, fitting doors to the platform edges would have led to severe service disruptions and station closures. Another problem would have been that the conventionally run trains would have had to be stopped by the driver within a distance of a few centimeters, which would have been difficult. Therefore, platform doors were out of the question. After tests with laser light barriers (from the station ceiling to the platform edge) at Plärrer, a combination of CCTV cameras overlooking the track bed and radio frequency barriers from under the platform edge to the opposing wall were chosen and installed at all stations served by U3. The RF barriers will detect persons and objects falling onto the track. In such a case the ATC will stop any approaching trains on that track immediately and alert the control centre, from where an operator can visually inspect the trackbed at the platform over CCTV and then take the appropriate action.

=== Technical problems leading to a 2-year delay ===
Construction of the line started in 2003, with the DT3 units ordered in the same year, and opening of the initial line segment from Maxfeld to Gustav-Adolf-Straße had been scheduled for early 2006 to be operational for the 2006 FIFA World Cup.

Initially it was thought by Siemens and VAG that development, testing and certification of the ATC components could be conducted during those 3 years in parallel to the construction of the line, at first in simulations and, after the first DT3 units had been delivered, on a test track at the Langwasser Depot, and that the new line could enter service immediately after the tunnels and stations were built. However, in 2005 news was published that ATC development was not progressing as planned and that the opening would have to be postponed by one year to late 2006 or early 2007. In fall 2006 the responsible parties had to admit that the ATC system would still not be ready by the already postponed date at the end of 2006 and that the opening of the line would have to be postponed again. At that point, Siemens appointed a new project manager. The new U3 line finally opened on 14 June 2008.

To Siemens this delay is a major embarrassment, since the company hopes to sell this ATC system to other metro operators around the world who wish to gradually convert their existing metro lines to ATC operation, allowing for mixed operations on line segments used by ATC and non-ATC operated trains during interim periods.

=== Conversion of the U2 for ATC operation ===
After the initial segment of the U3 had entered service and all problems concerning the ATC system had been sorted out, work commenced on the conversion the existing U2 to ATC operation. Full ATC operation of the U2 begun in January 2010 and on the shared section of track between Rathenauplatz and Rothenburger Straße the interval between trains on that tunnel segment reduced to 100 seconds. (See above)

== See also ==
- List of Nuremberg U-Bahn stations
- List of driverless trains
- Trams in Nuremberg
- List of metro systems
- Rail transport in Germany
