= Nordwestring station =

Metro station in Nuremberg, Germany

Nordwestring
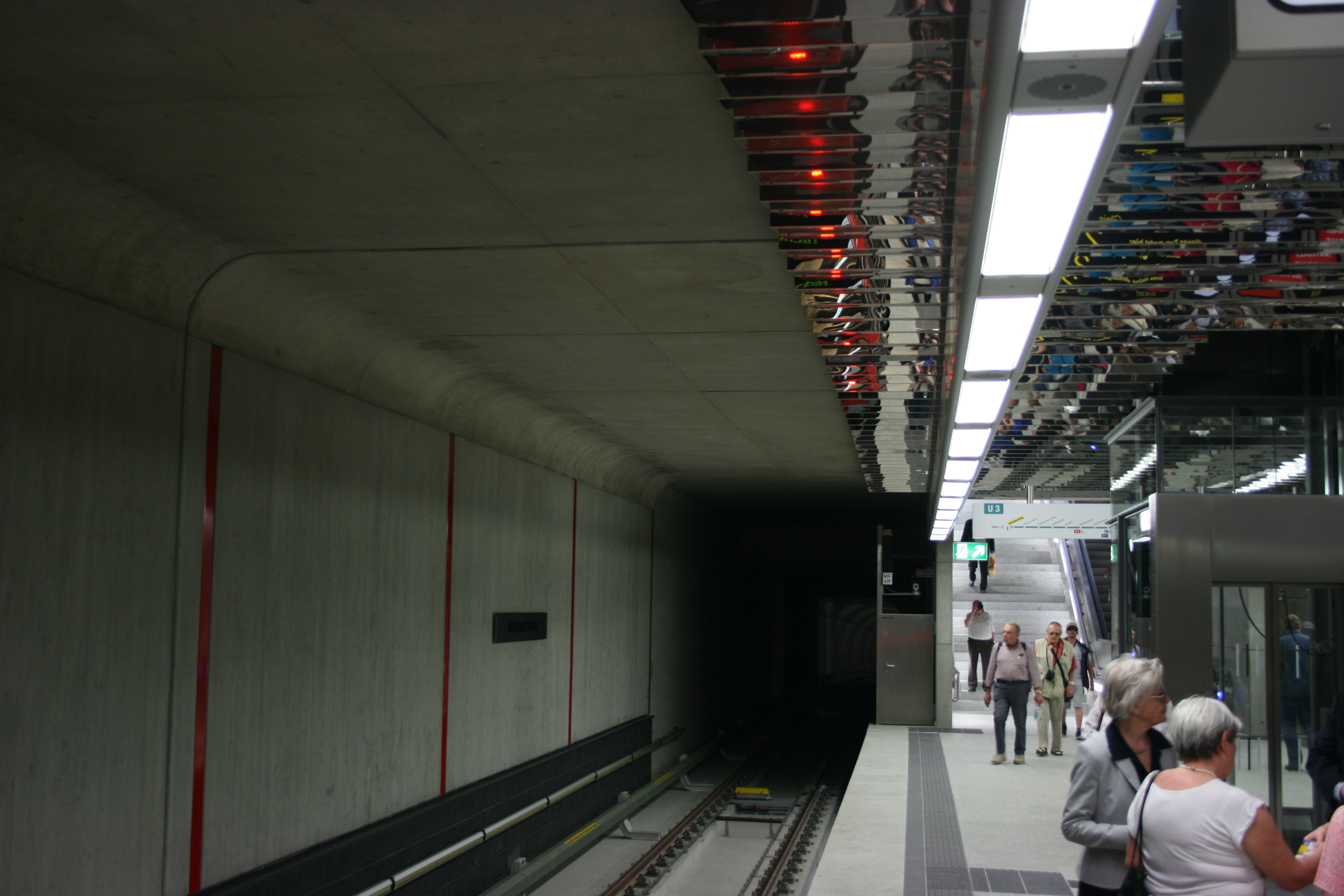

General information
- Coordinates: 49.4657°N 11.0549°E
- System: Nuremberg U-Bahn station
- Operator: Verkehrs-Aktiengesellschaft Nürnberg

Construction
- Structure type: Underground

Other information
- Fare zone: VGN: 100

History
- Opened: 22 May 2017

Services
Preceding station	Nuremberg U-Bahn	Following station
Klinikum Nord towards Großreuth bei Schweinau	U3	Terminus
Location

Nordwestring station is a Nuremberg U-Bahn station. It is the northern terminus of the U3 line and opened on 22 May 2017.

== Location ==
The station is located on the border of the Nuremberg districts Bielingplatz and Wetzendorf and extends underground in east-west orientation across the Nordwestring (part of B4R) between Bielefelder Straße and Heimerichstraße. The building is located in a simple depth (7.70 m) below the Earth's surface. At each platform end there is an elevator, as well as stairs and escalators, which are a direct link to the surface. Behind the underground station, under Bielefelder Straße, there is a 170 m long, double-track tunnel, which is used as a parking or turning facility.

== Gallery ==
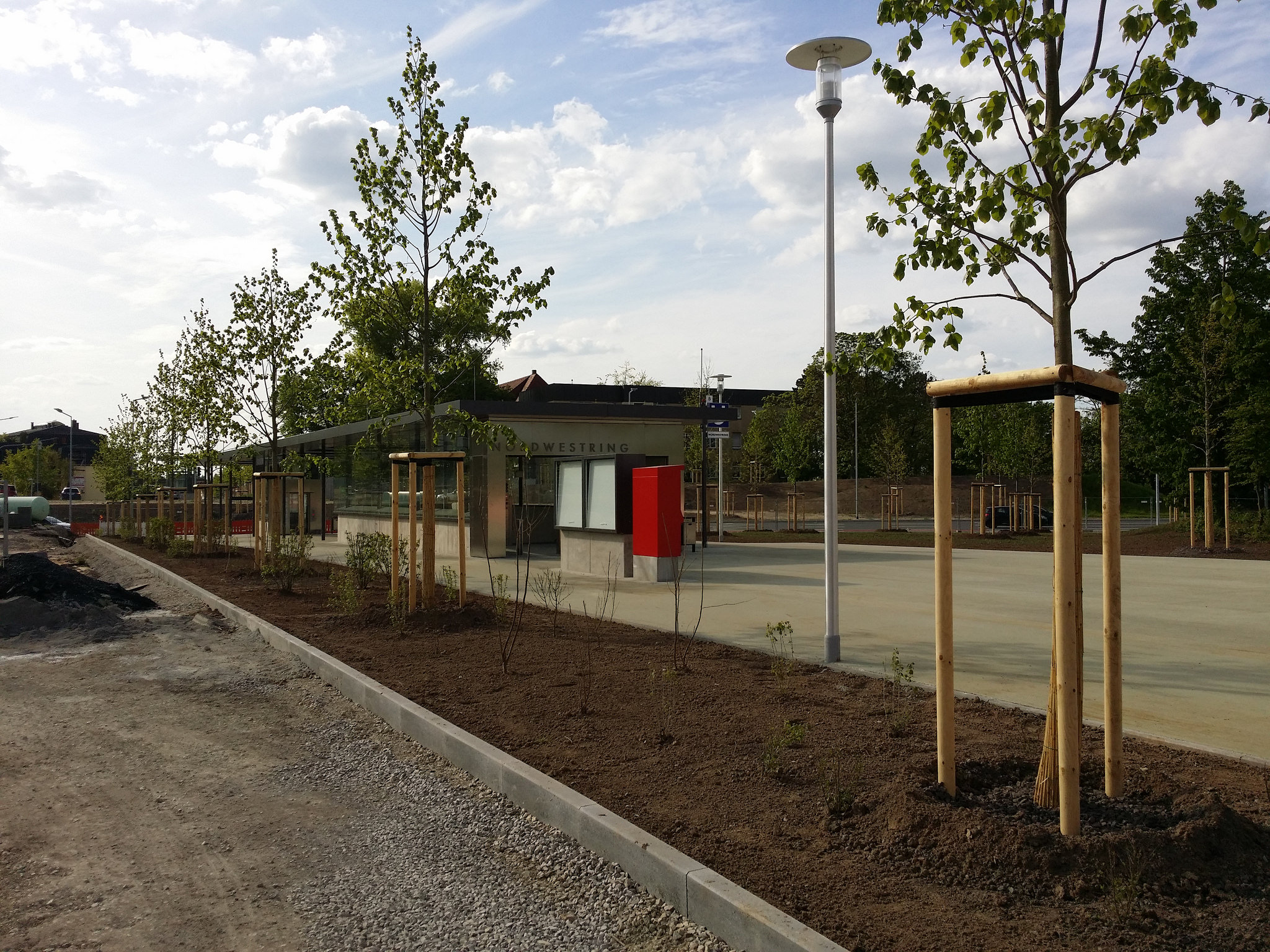
Nordwestring in May 2017

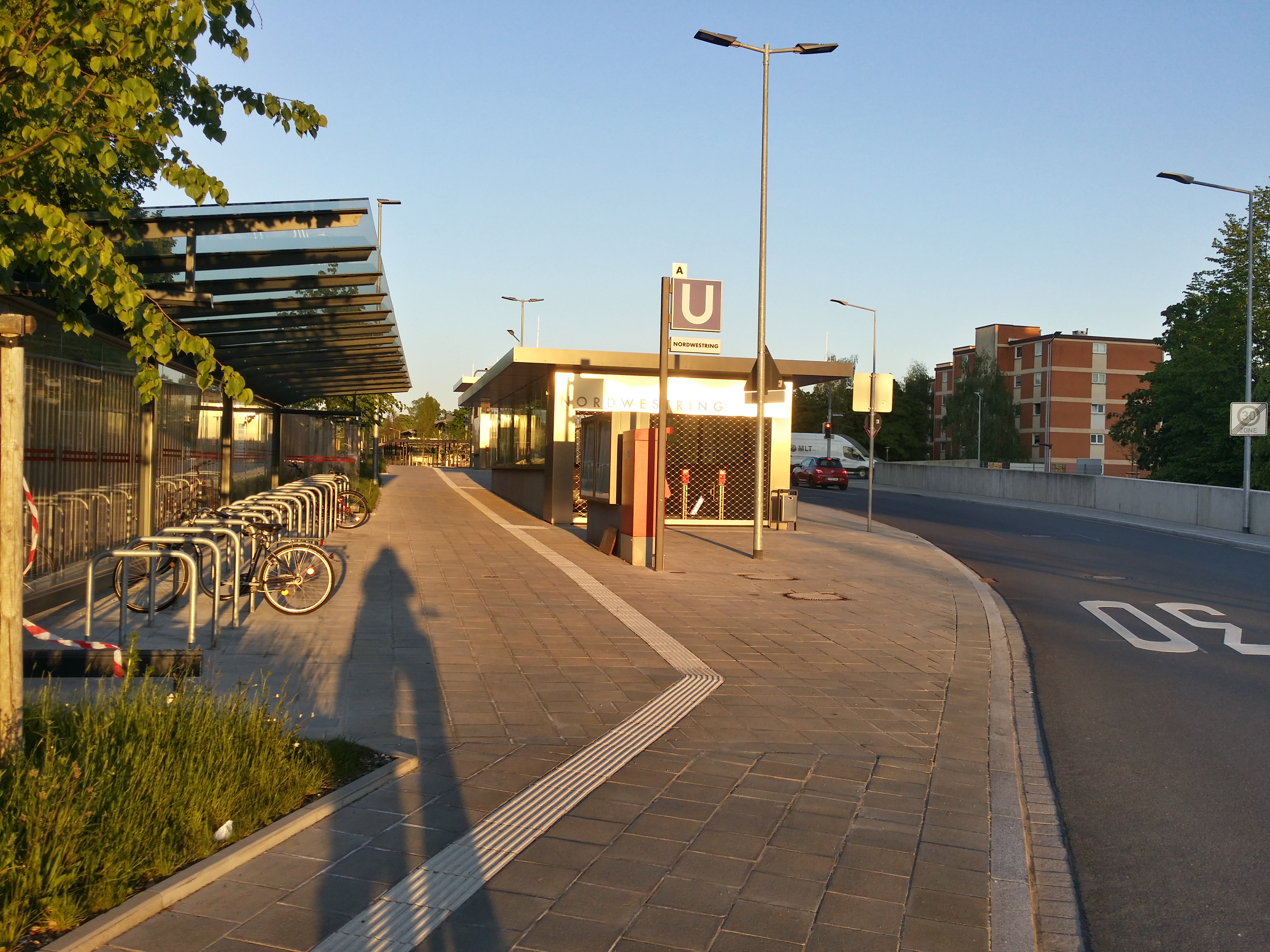
The entrance at Nordwestring

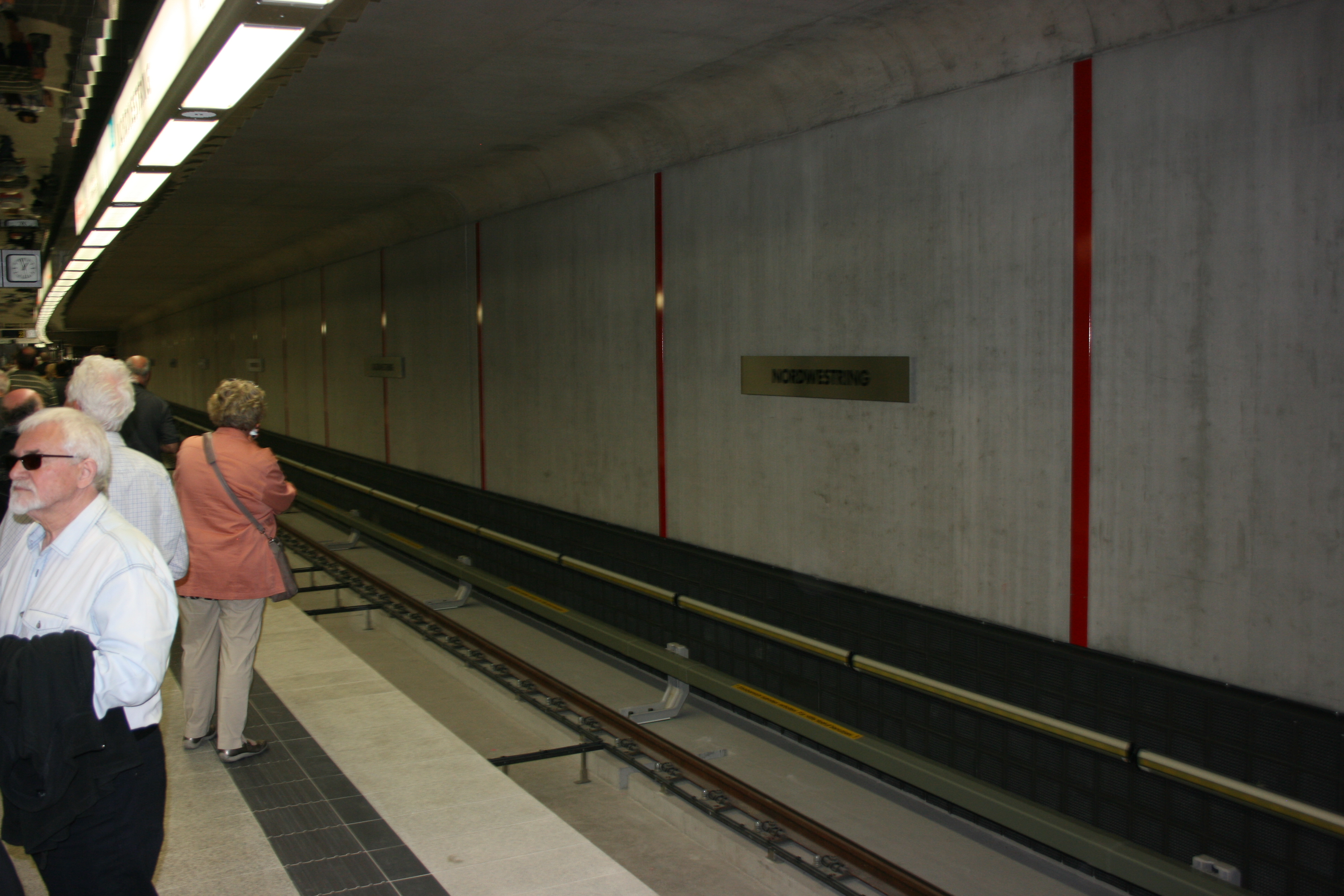
The platform at Nordwestring
