= Großreuth bei Schweinau station =

Metro station in Nuremberg, Germany

Großreuth bei Schweinau
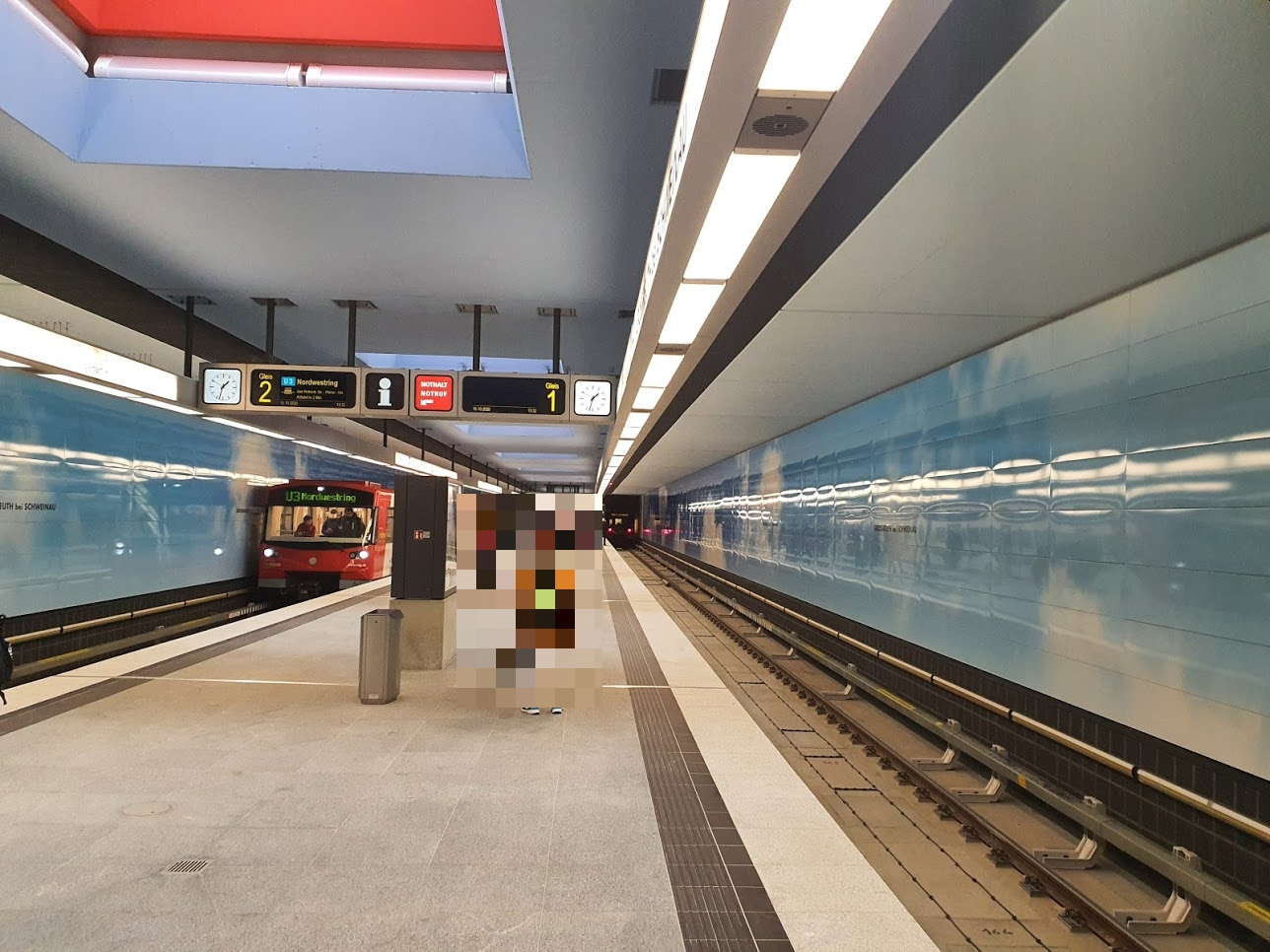

General information
- Location: Nürnberg, Germany
- Coordinates: 49.439306°N 11.024337°E
- System: Nuremberg U-Bahn station
- Operator: Verkehrs-Aktiengesellschaft Nürnberg

Construction
- Structure type: Underground
- Depth: 8.60 metres (28.2 ft)

Other information
- Fare zone: VGN: 100

History
- Opened: 15 October 2020

Services
Preceding station	Nuremberg U-Bahn	Following station
Terminus	U3	Gustav-Adolf-Straße towards Nordwestring
Location

Großreuth bei Schweinau station is a Nuremberg U-Bahn station, located on the U3. Named for the borough Großreuth bei Schweinau. The distance to the previous station, Gustav Adolf Straße is 898 metres (2,946 ft) as the crow flies. Opening in October 2020, it was the 49th station of Nuremberg U-Bahn to open and serves as the terminus for line U3 until the opening of further extensions towards Gebersdorf.
