= Aufseßplatz station =

Metro station in Nuremberg, Germany

Aufseßplatz
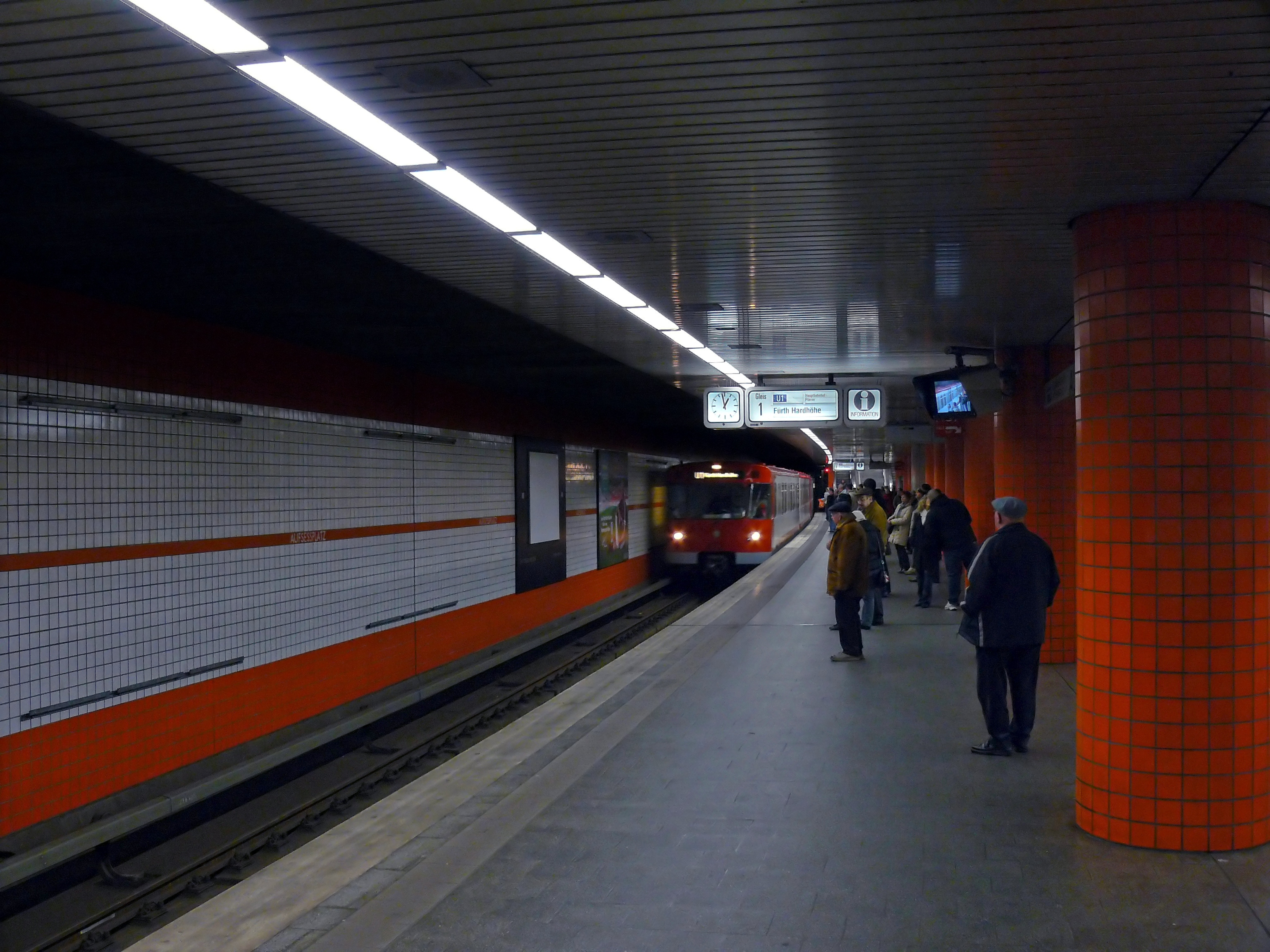

General information
- Location: Wölckernstraße; 90459 Nürnberg, Germany
- Coordinates: 49.4404234°N 11.0809894°E
- System: Nuremberg U-Bahn station
- Operator: Verkehrs-Aktiengesellschaft Nürnberg
- Connections: Tram: Tiergarten – Worzeldorfer Straße; Doku-Zentrum – Westfriedhof

Construction
- Structure type: Underground

Other information
- Fare zone: VGN: 100

History
- Opened: 23 September 1975

Services
Preceding station	Nuremberg U-Bahn	Following station
Nürnberg Hbf towards Fürth Hardhöhe	U1	Maffeiplatz towards Langwasser Süd
Location

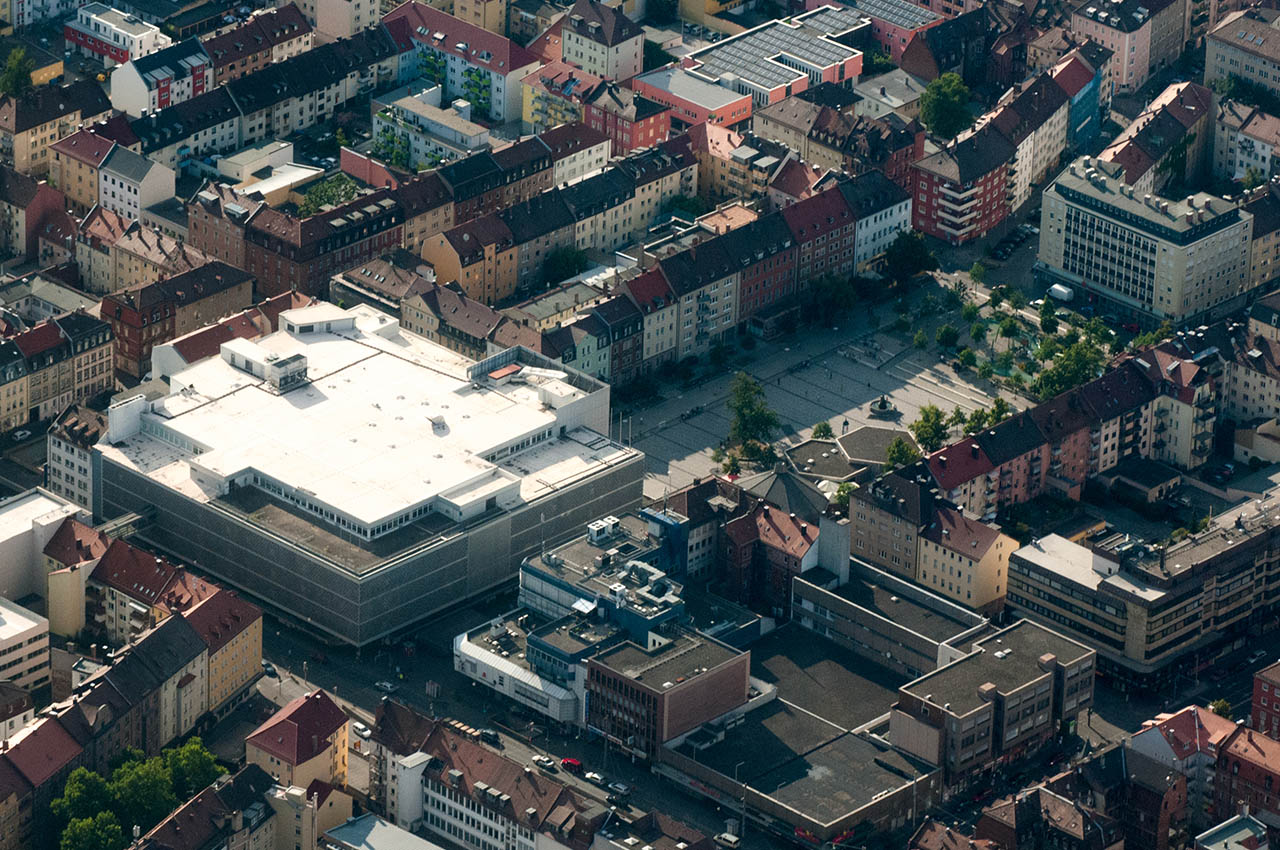
Aerial of Aufseßplatz

Aufseßplatz station is a Nuremberg U-Bahn station, located on the U1 line.

An unused tunnel stub for a connection curve exists south of the station on the side of the north-bound track. This curve was meant as connection to another subway line from Plärrer to Dutzendteich, which never got beyond an early planning stage. Like Plärrer, Hauptbahnhof and the much later Friedrich Ebert Platz orange tiles were used to indicate a possible interchange station. However, as of 2022 only Plärrer and Hauptbahnhof actually are interchange stations between different subway mainlines. While Aufseßplatz is also served by Tram line 5, this is a distinction three other stations (Rathenauplatz station, Frankenstraße station, Wöhrder Wiese station) share in addition to all four "orange tiled" ones.
