= Maffeiplatz station =

Metro station in Nuremberg, Germany

Maffeiplatz
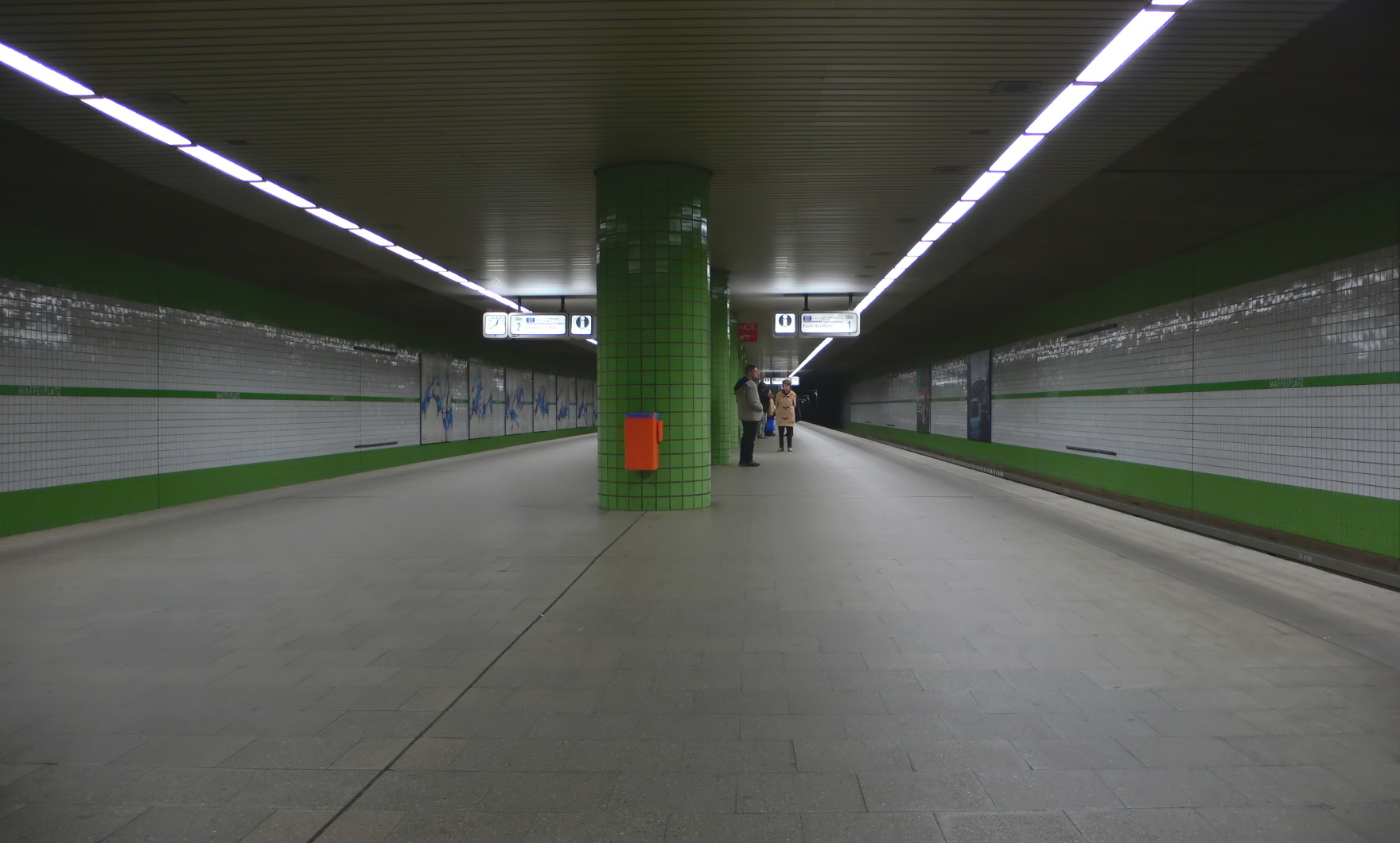

General information
- Location: Pillenreuther Str. 90459 Nürnberg, Germany
- Coordinates: 49.4360733°N 11.0840201°E
- System: Nuremberg U-Bahn station
- Operator: Verkehrs-Aktiengesellschaft Nürnberg

Construction
- Structure type: Underground

Other information
- Fare zone: VGN: 100

History
- Opened: 23 September 1975

Services
Preceding station	Nuremberg U-Bahn	Following station
Aufseßplatz towards Fürth Hardhöhe	U1	Frankenstraße towards Langwasser Süd
Location

Maffeiplatz station is a Nuremberg U-Bahn station, located on the U1 line.
