= Hasenbuck station =

Metro station in Nuremberg, Germany

Hasenbuck
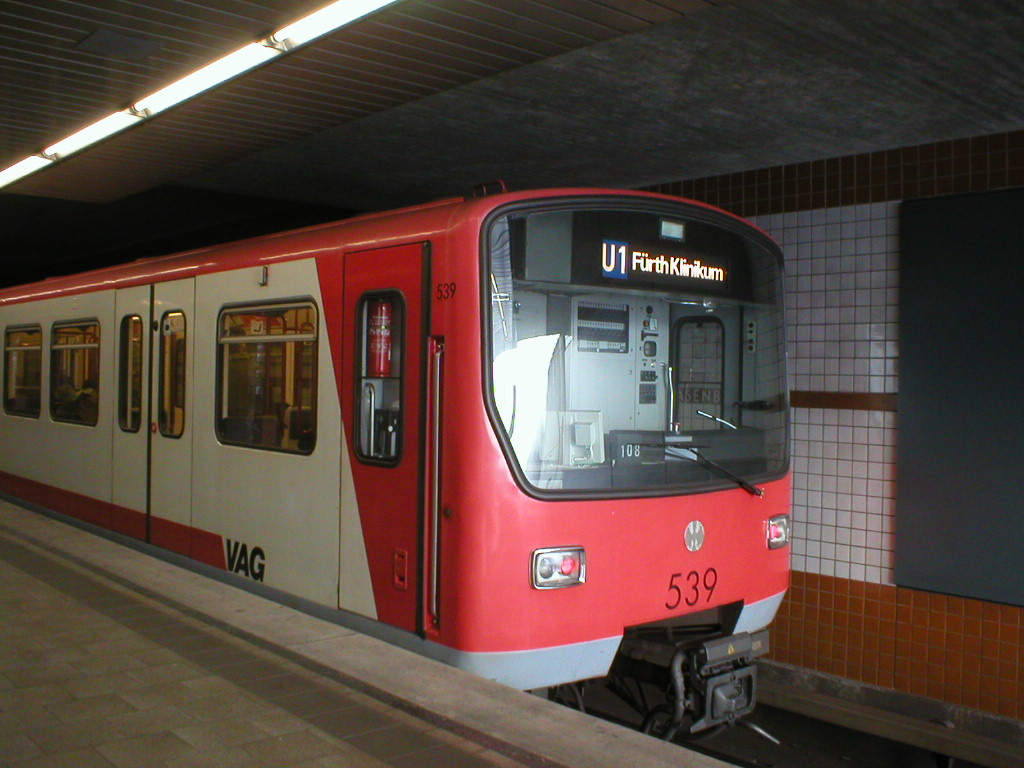

General information
- Location: Ingolstädter Str. 90461 Nürnberg, Germany
- Coordinates: 49.4247761°N 11.0896109°E
- System: Nuremberg U-Bahn station
- Operator: Verkehrs-Aktiengesellschaft Nürnberg

Construction
- Structure type: Underground

Other information
- Fare zone: VGN: 100 and 200

History
- Opened: 18 June 1974

Services
Preceding station	Nuremberg U-Bahn	Following station
Frankenstraße towards Fürth Hardhöhe	U1	Bauernfeindstraße towards Langwasser Süd
Location

Hasenbuck station is a Nuremberg U-Bahn station, located on the U1 line.
