= Langwasser Mitte station =

Metro station in Nuremberg, Germany

Langwasser Mitte
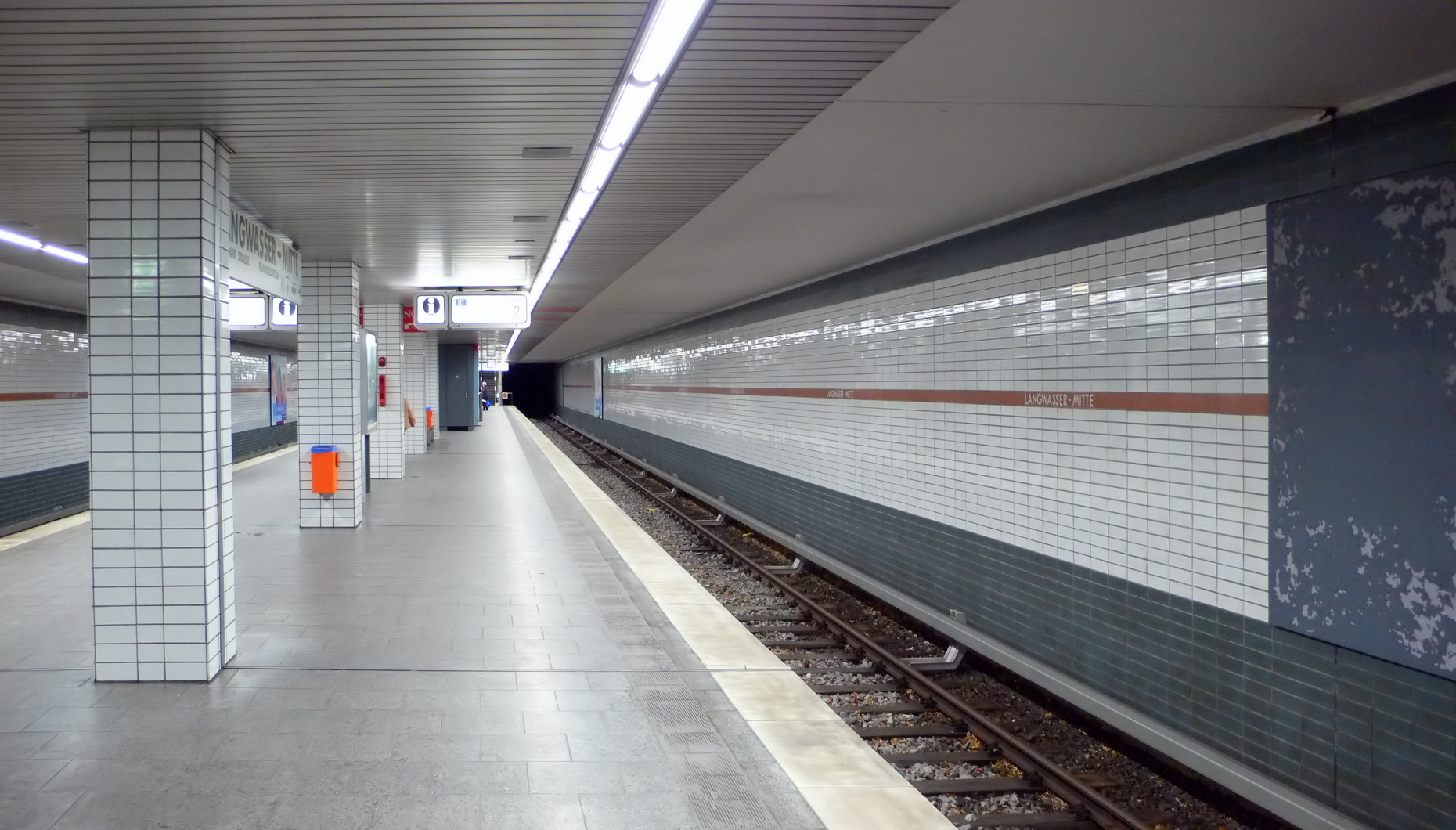

General information
- Location: Breslauer Str. 90471 Nürnberg, Germany
- Coordinates: 49.404867°N 11.1319791°E
- System: Nuremberg U-Bahn station
- Operator: Verkehrs-Aktiengesellschaft Nürnberg
- Connections: Bus: 50 Langwasser Mitte - Feucht/Am Reichswald; 52 Langwasser Mitte - Katzwang Süd; 55 Langwasser Mitte - Meistersingerhalle; 56 Langwasser Mitte - Flachsröste; 57 Langwasser Mitte - Fischbach Bf. Wende; 68 Langwasser Mitte - Gustav-Adolf-Str.; 92 Meistersingerhalle - Katzwang Süd; 93 Meistersingerhalle - Kornburg; 98 Langwasser Mitte - Stein Schloß; 504 Nürnberg - Pavelsbach; 602 Langwasser Mitte - Kleinschwarzenlohe; 603 Langwasser Mitte - Raubersried; 610 Langwasser Mitte - Kleinschwarzenlohe - Großschwarzenlohe

Construction
- Structure type: Underground

Other information
- Fare zone: VGN: 200

History
- Opened: 1 March 1972

Services
Preceding station	Nuremberg U-Bahn	Following station
Scharfreiterring towards Fürth Hardhöhe	U1	Gemeinschaftshaus towards Langwasser Süd
Location

Langwasser Mitte station is a Nuremberg U-Bahn station, located on the U1 line.
