= Fürth Stadthalle station =

Metro station in Fürth, Germany

Fürth Stadthalle
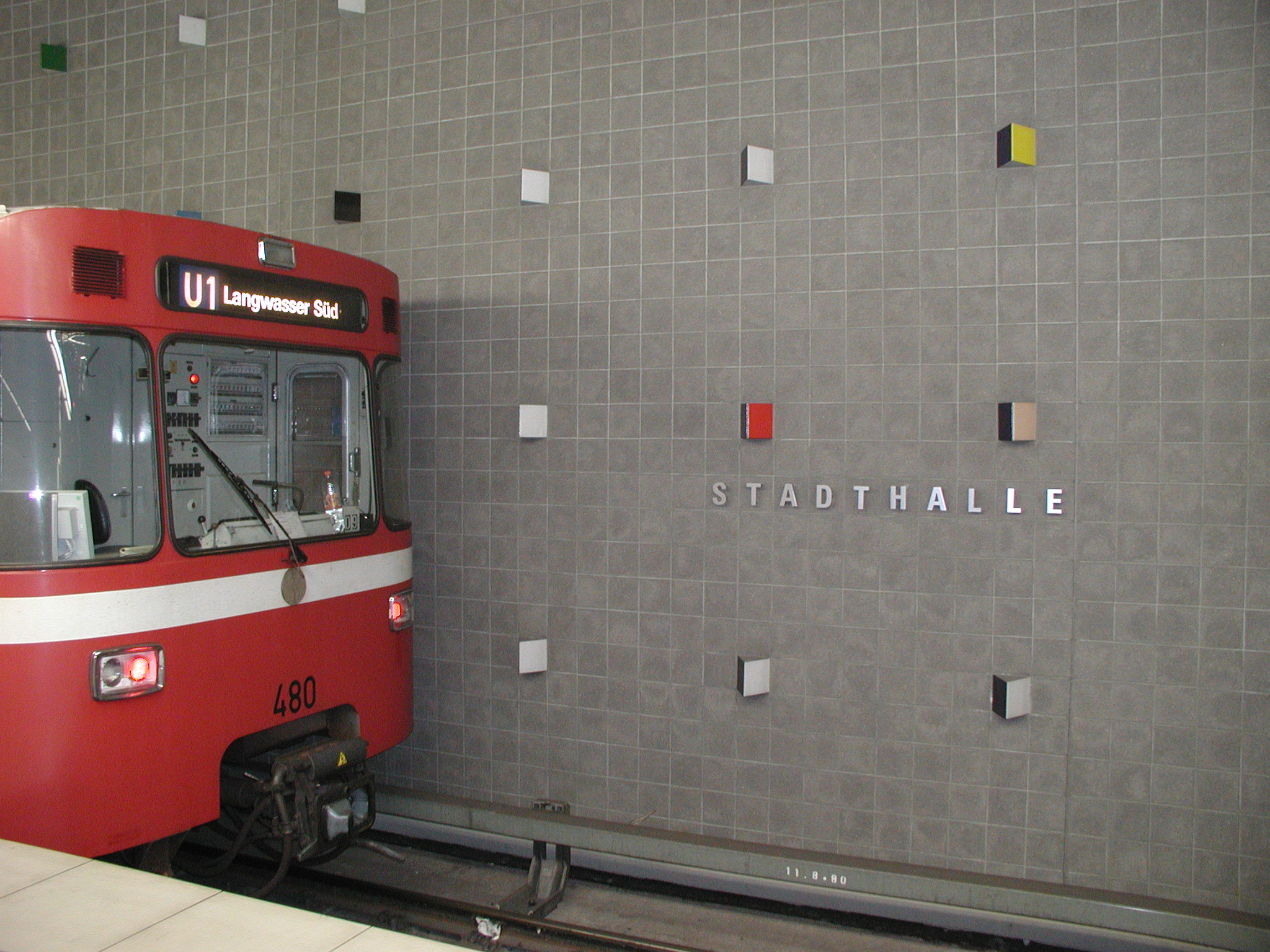

General information
- Location: Würzburger Str. 90762 Fürth, Germany
- Coordinates: 49.4802603°N 10.9817937°E
- System: Nuremberg U-Bahn station
- Operator: Verkehrs-Aktiengesellschaft Nürnberg
- Connections: Bus: 125 Fürth - Siegelsdorf; 172 Fürth Hbf - Burgfarrnbach; 175 Vach Nord - Stadtgrenze

Construction
- Structure type: Underground

Other information
- Fare zone: VGN: 200

History
- Opened: 5 December 1998

Services
Preceding station	Nuremberg U-Bahn	Following station
Fürth Klinikum towards Fürth Hardhöhe	U1	Fürth Rathaus towards Langwasser Süd
Location

Fürth Stadthalle station is a Nuremberg U-Bahn station, located on the U1 in Fürth.
