= Muggenhof station =

Metro station in Nuremberg, Germany

Muggenhof
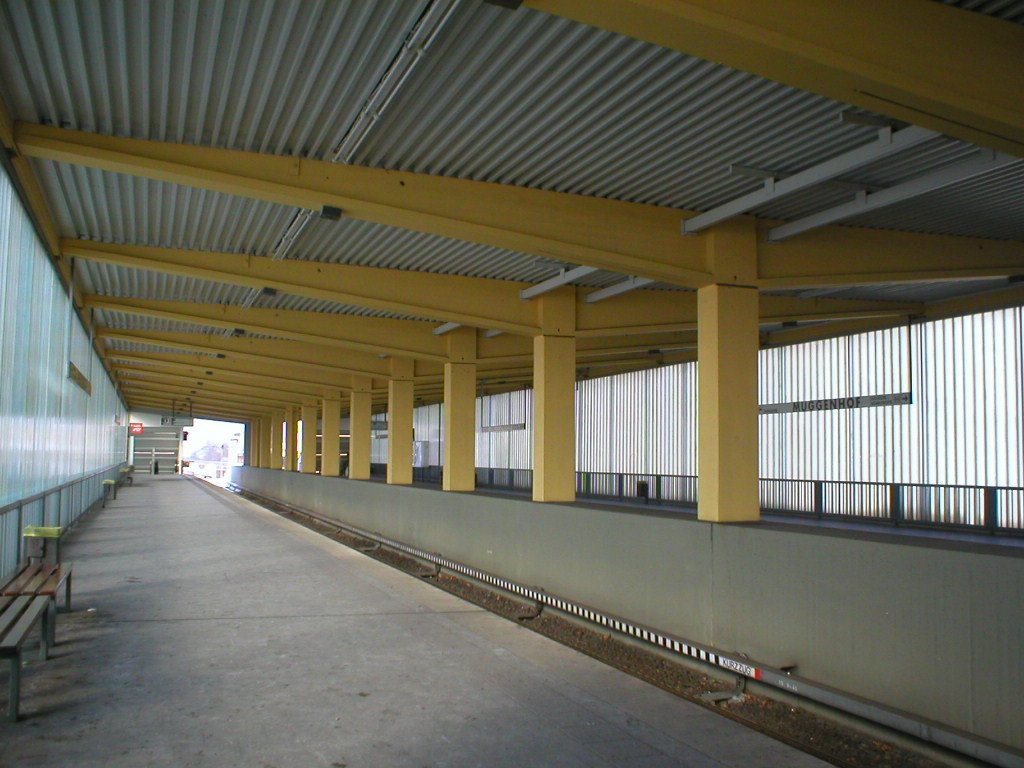

General information
- Location: Fürther Str. 90429 Nürnberg, Germany
- Coordinates: 49.461777°N 11.0228107°E
- System: Nuremberg U-Bahn station
- Operator: Verkehrs-Aktiengesellschaft Nürnberg

Construction
- Structure type: Elevated

Other information
- Fare zone: VGN: 100

History
- Opened: 20 March 1982

Services
Preceding station	Nuremberg U-Bahn	Following station
Stadtgrenze towards Fürth Hardhöhe	U1	Eberhardshof towards Langwasser Süd
Location

Muggenhof station is a Nuremberg U-Bahn station, located on the U1.
