= Bauernfeindstraße station =

Metro station in Nuremberg, Germany

Bauernfeindstraße
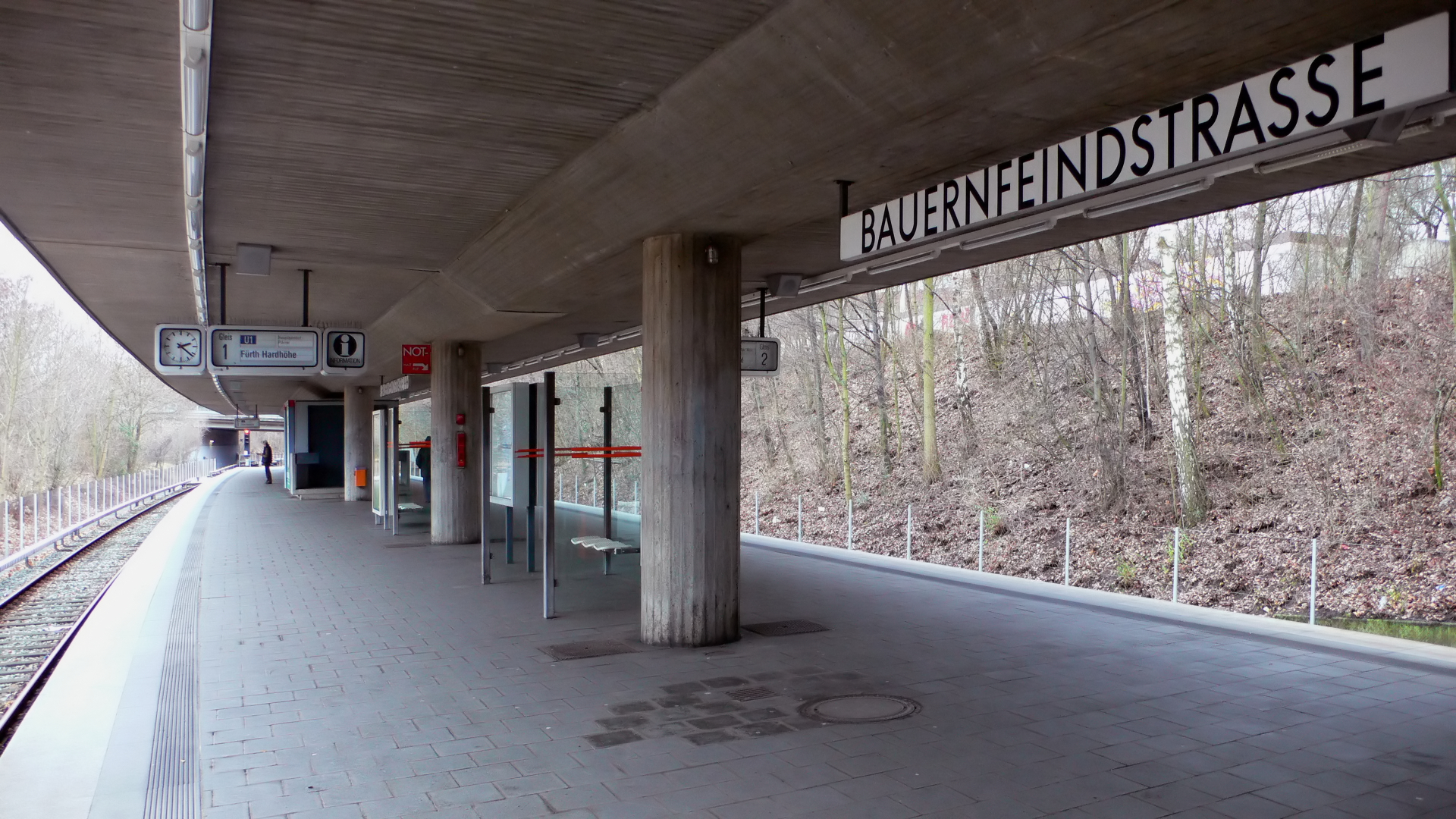

General information
- Location: Bauernfeindstraße; 90471 Nürnberg, Germany
- Coordinates: 49.4172851°N 11.1075699°E
- System: Nuremberg U-Bahn station
- Operator: Verkehrs-Aktiengesellschaft Nürnberg
- Connections: Bus: 603 Nürnberg Langwasser Mitte - Raubersried

Construction
- Structure type: At grade

Other information
- Fare zone: VGN: 200

History
- Opened: 1 March 1972

Services
Preceding station	Nuremberg U-Bahn	Following station
Hasenbuck towards Fürth Hardhöhe	U1	Messe towards Langwasser Süd
Location

Bauernfeindstraße station is a Nuremberg U-Bahn station, located on the U1 line.
