= Fürth Rathaus station =

Metro station in Fürth, Germany

Fürth Rathaus
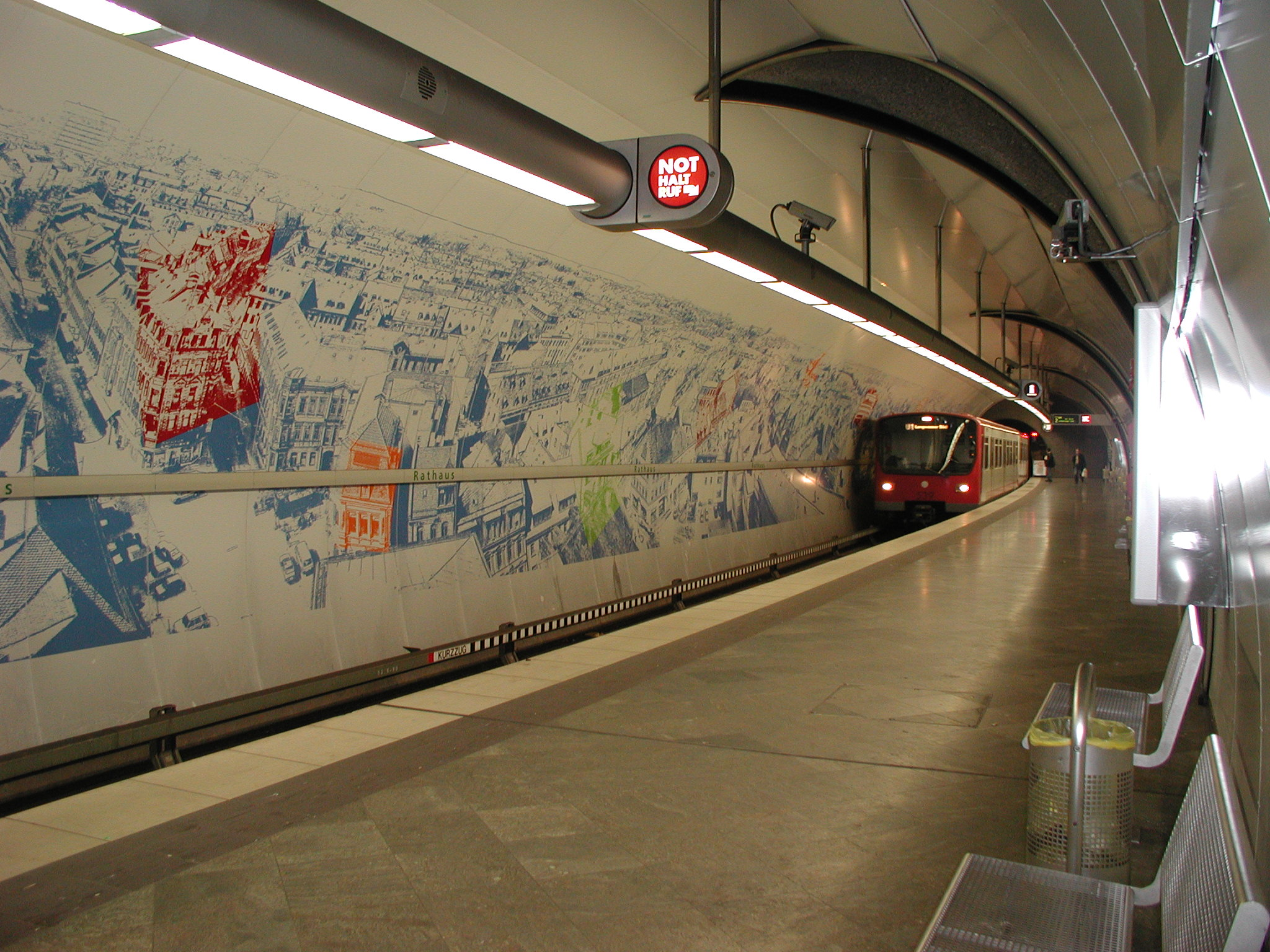

General information
- Location: Ludwig-Erhard-Str. 90762 Fürth, Germany
- Coordinates: 49.4776355°N 10.988477°E
- System: Nuremberg U-Bahn station
- Operator: Verkehrs-Aktiengesellschaft Nürnberg
- Connections: Bus: 125 Fürth - Siegelsdorf; 173 Jakobinenstr. - Atzenhof; 174 Jakobinenstr. - Vach; 175 Vach Nord - Stadtgrenze; 177 Europaallee - Rudolf-Schiestl-Str.; 178 Weiherhof - Schmalau; 179 Fürth Süd bzw. Europaallee - Großgründlach

Construction
- Structure type: Underground

Other information
- Fare zone: VGN: 200

History
- Opened: 5 December 1998

Services
Preceding station	Nuremberg U-Bahn	Following station
Fürth Stadthalle towards Fürth Hardhöhe	U1	Fürth Hbf towards Langwasser Süd
Location

Fürth Rathaus station is a Nuremberg U-Bahn station located in Fürth, run by the line U1.

Rathaus, meaning town hall in German, is the U-Bahn station for Fürth's town hall (not that of Nuremberg).

This station features a painting on the wall, representing the whole inner city of Fürth. The station is a central hub for public transport. Here, change for city bus lines 173, 174, 175, 177, 178, 179, as well as regional bus lines 124 and 125 is possible.

Also, the station is the fourth U-Bahn station within Fürth, when coming from Nuremberg.
