= Eberhardshof station =

Metro station in Nuremberg, Germany

Eberhardshof
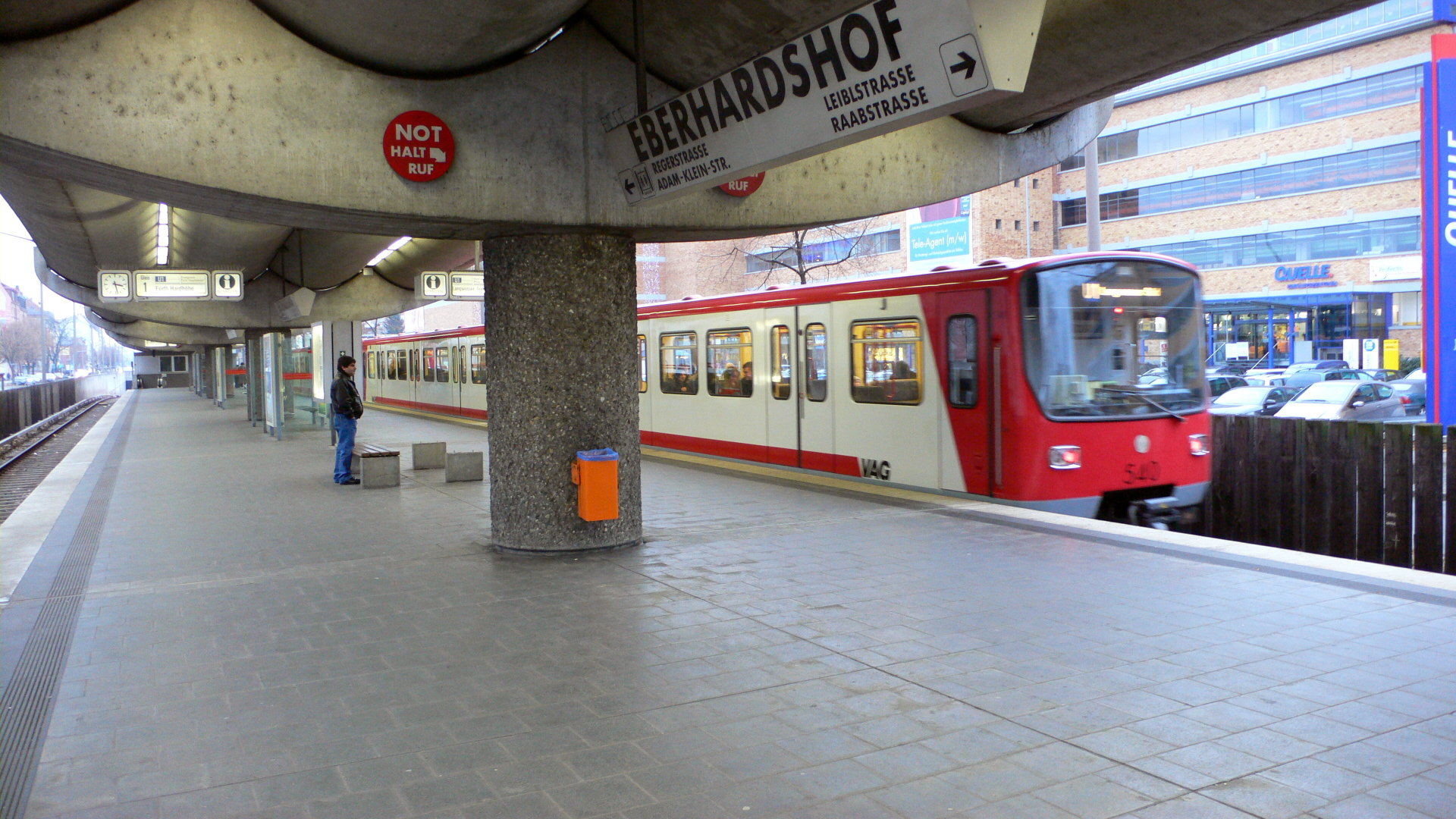

General information
- Location: Fürther Str. 90459 Nürnberg, Germany
- Coordinates: 49.4582802°N 11.0338301°E
- System: Nuremberg U-Bahn station
- Operator: Verkehrs-Aktiengesellschaft Nürnberg

Construction
- Structure type: At grade

Other information
- Fare zone: VGN: 100

History
- Opened: 20 June 1981

Services
Preceding station	Nuremberg U-Bahn	Following station
Muggenhof towards Fürth Hardhöhe	U1	Maximilianstraße towards Langwasser Süd
Location

Eberhardshof station is a Nuremberg U-Bahn station, located on the U1.

It used to be the terminus for the "booster" line U11 until 2017 when trains formerly marked "U11" and "U21" were folded into U1 and U2.
