= Scharfreiterring station =

Metro station in Nuremberg, Germany

Scharfreiterring
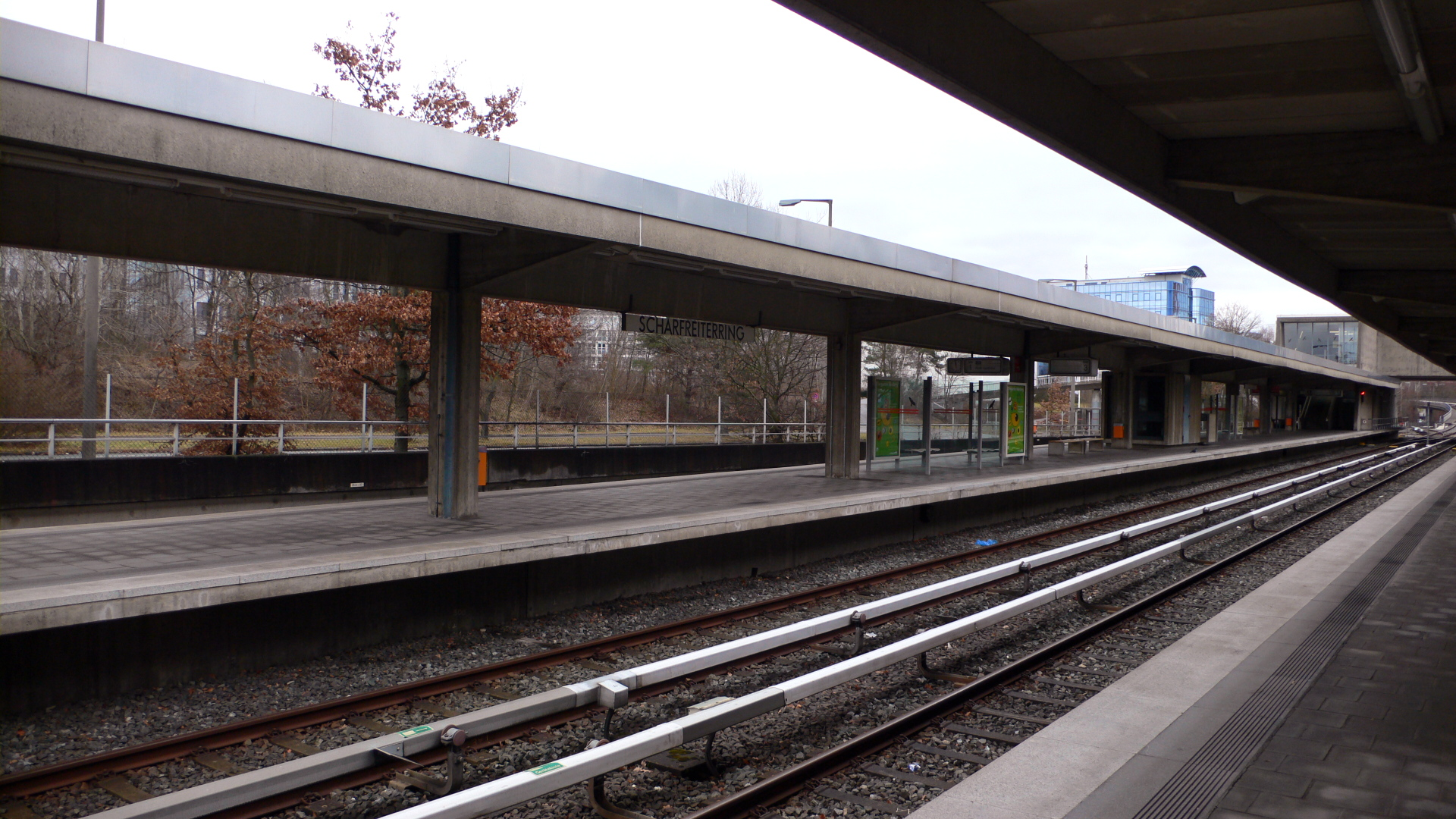

General information
- Location: Otto-Bärnreuther-Str. 90471 Nürnberg, Germany
- Coordinates: 49.4083831°N 11.1270115°E
- System: Nuremberg U-Bahn station
- Operator: Verkehrs-Aktiengesellschaft Nürnberg
- Connections: Bus: 55 Meistersingerhalle - Langwasser Mitte; 92 Meistersingerhalle - Katzwang Süd; 93 Meistersingerhalle - Kornburg

Construction
- Structure type: At grade

Other information
- Fare zone: VGN: 200

History
- Opened: 1 March 1972

Services
Preceding station	Nuremberg U-Bahn	Following station
Langwasser Nord towards Fürth Hardhöhe	U1	Langwasser Mitte towards Langwasser Süd
Location

Scharfreiterring station is a Nuremberg U-Bahn station, located on the U1 line.
