= Stadtgrenze station =

Metro station in Nuremberg, Germany

Stadtgrenze
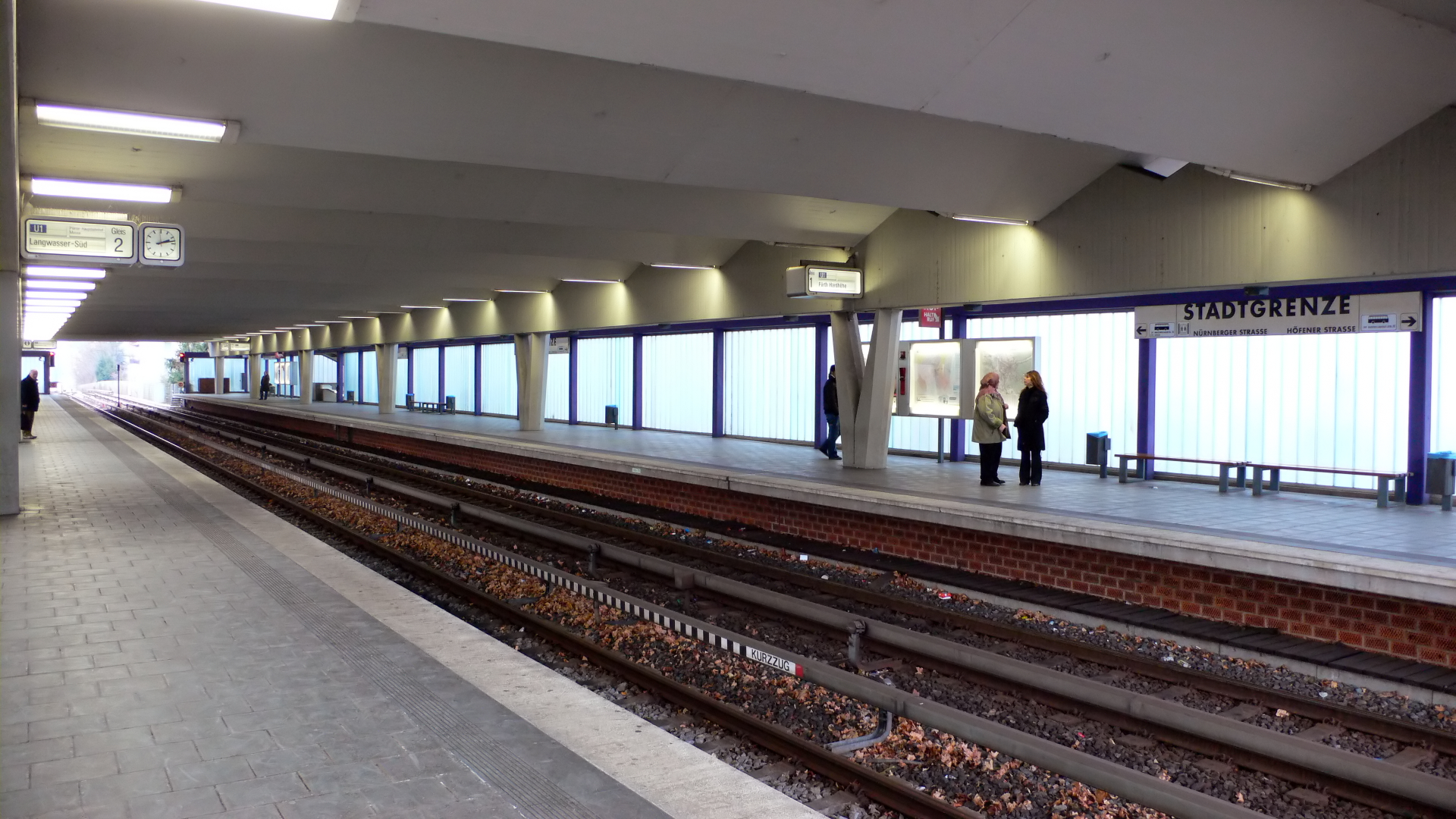

General information
- Location: Nürnberger Str. 90762 Fürth, Germany
- Coordinates: 49.4655°N 11.0110°E
- System: Nuremberg U-Bahn station
- Operator: Verkehrs-Aktiengesellschaft Nürnberg
- Connections: Bus: 39 Gustav-Adolf-Str. - Maximilianstr.; 175 Vach Nord, Stadtgrenze

Construction
- Structure type: Embankment

Other information
- Fare zone: VGN: 100 and 200

History
- Opened: 20 March 1982

Services
Preceding station	Nuremberg U-Bahn	Following station
Jakobinenstraße towards Fürth Hardhöhe	U1	Muggenhof towards Langwasser Süd
Location

Stadtgrenze station is a Nuremberg U-Bahn station, located on the U1. Although it is officially tagged Nuremberg Stadtgrenze, its buildings are located in Fürth. Stadtgrenze means town limit in German.

== History ==
As the U1 line was built from East to West, the opening of this station and the one immediately to the West (Jakobinenstraße station) on the same day marked the beginning of subway service to Fürth, replacing the tram which had ceased serving Fürth the year prior.
