= Maximilianstraße station =

Metro station in Nuremberg, Germany

Maximilianstraße
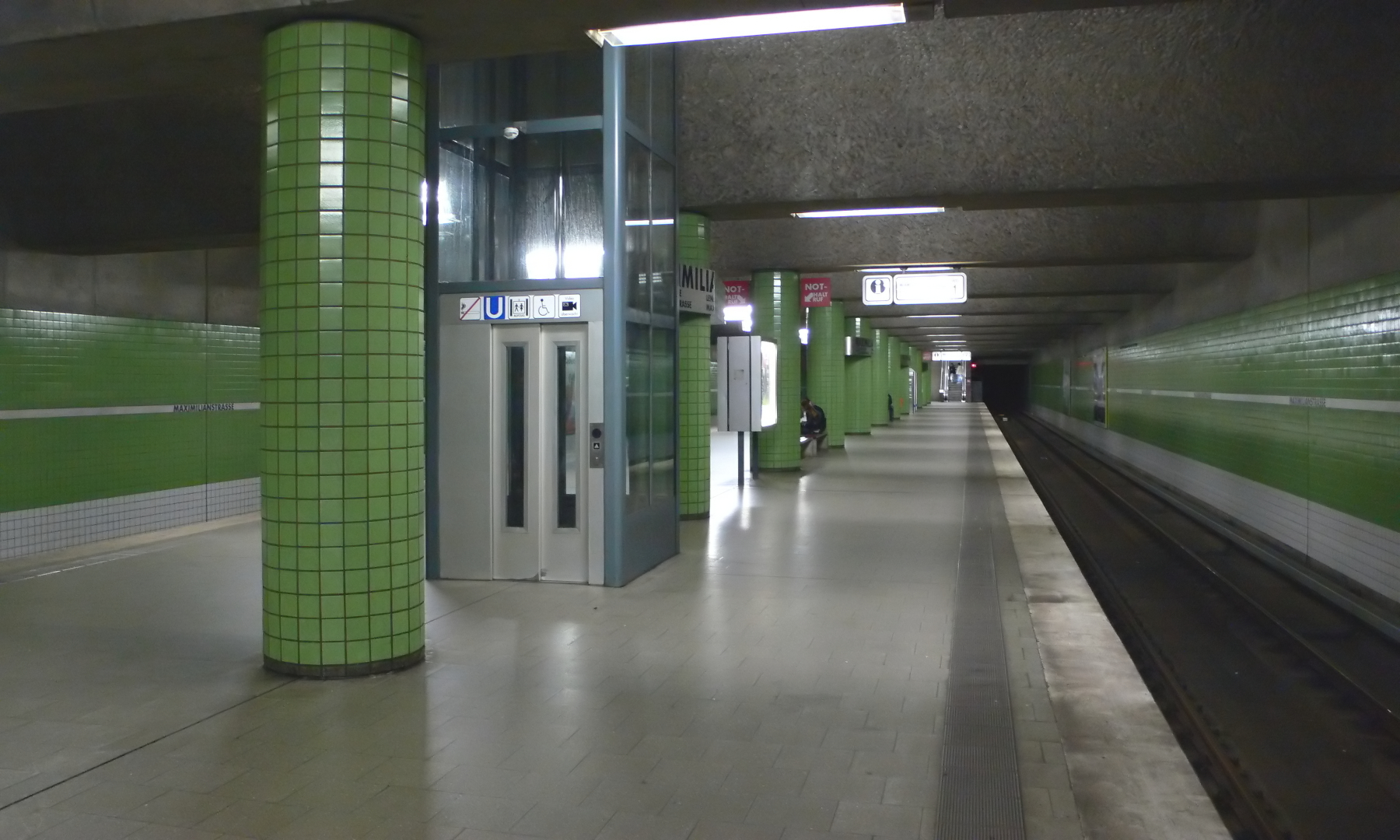

General information
- Location: Fürther Str. 90429 Nürnberg, Germany
- Coordinates: 49.4553813°N 11.042748°E
- System: Nuremberg U-Bahn station
- Operator: Verkehrs-Aktiengesellschaft Nürnberg
- Connections: Bus: 35 Röthenbach - Nordostbf; 38 Höfen / Virnsberger Straße - Kriegsopfersiedlung; 39 Gustav-Adolf-Str. - Maximilianstr.

Construction
- Structure type: Underground

Other information
- Fare zone: VGN: 100

History
- Opened: 20 June 1981

Services
Preceding station	Nuremberg U-Bahn	Following station
Eberhardshof towards Fürth Hardhöhe	U1	Bärenschanze towards Langwasser Süd
Location

Maximilianstraße station is a Nuremberg U-Bahn station, located on the U1 line.
