= Fürth Klinikum station =

Metro station in Fürth, Germany

Fürth Klinikum
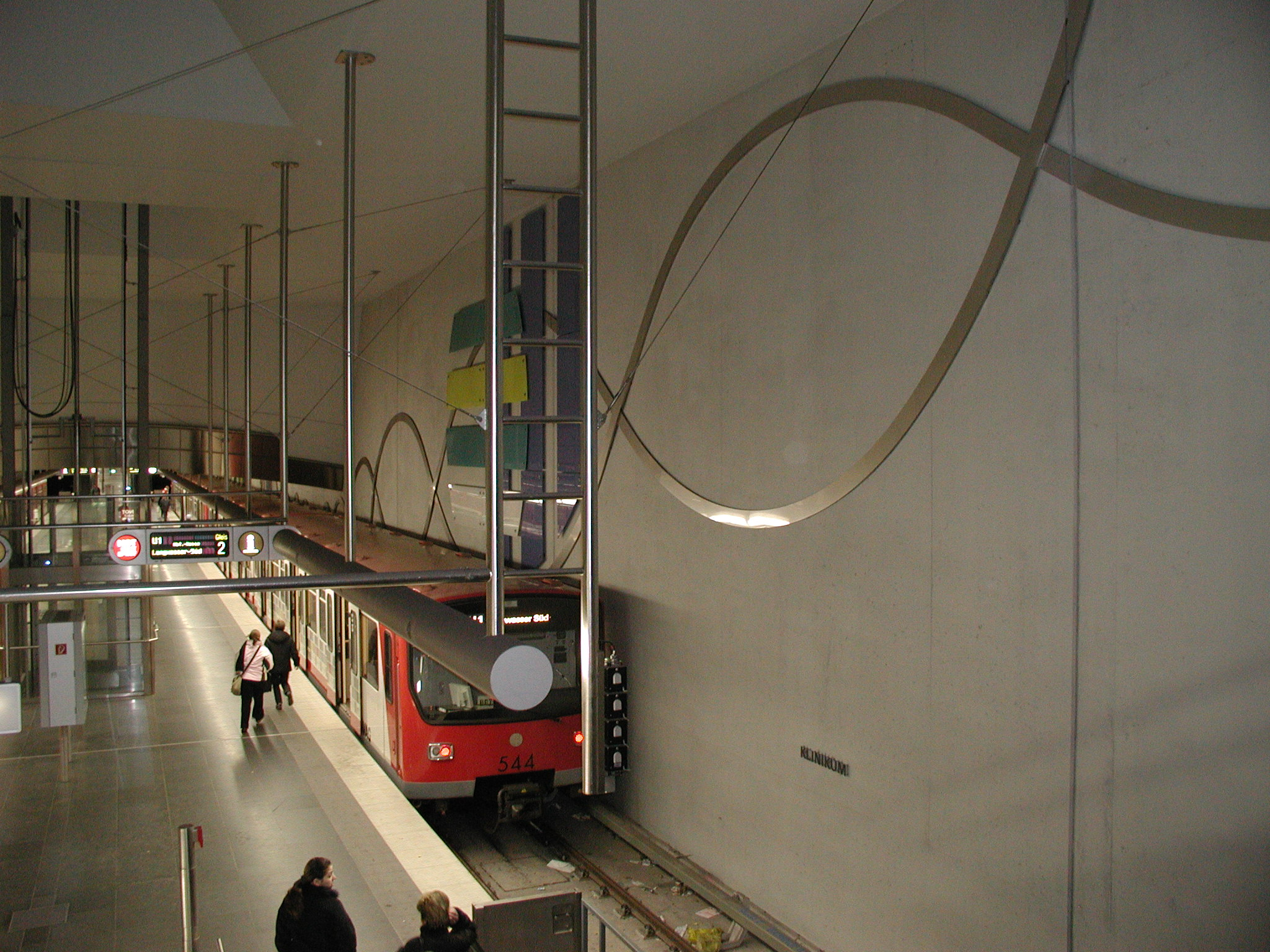

General information
- Location: Würzburger Str. 90766 Fürth, Germany
- Coordinates: 49°28′57″N 10°58′09″E
- System: Nuremberg U-Bahn station
- Operator: Verkehrs-Aktiengesellschaft Nürnberg
- Connections: Bus: 125 Fürth - Siegelsdorf; 126 Fürth - Cadolzburg bzw. Obermichelbach; 171 Vach Nord - Oberfürberg; 172 Fürth Hbf - Burgfarrnbach; 175 Vach Nord - Stadtgrenze

Construction
- Structure type: Underground

Other information
- Fare zone: VGN: 200

History
- Opened: 4 December 2004

Services
Preceding station	Nuremberg U-Bahn	Following station
Fürth Hardhöhe Terminus	U1	Fürth Stadthalle towards Langwasser Süd
Preceding station	Nuremberg S-Bahn	Following station
Vach towards Bamberg	S1 transfer at Fürth-Unterfarrnbach	Fürth Hbf towards Neumarkt (Oberpfalz)
Location

Fürth Klinikum station is a Nuremberg U-Bahn station.

Located on the U1 in Fürth, the station was opened on 12 December 2004. It is one of two opportunities to change between the U1 and the S1 of the S-Bahn Nuremberg in Fürth, the other being Fürth Hauptbahnhof. In the course of the quadruple tracking of the Nuremberg-Bamberg mainline it is planned to rename the S-Bahn stop currently called "Unterfarnbach" to "Fürth - Klinikum" to make the connection to the U-Bahn more apparent.
