= Frankenstraße station =

Metro station in Nuremberg, Germany

Frankenstraße
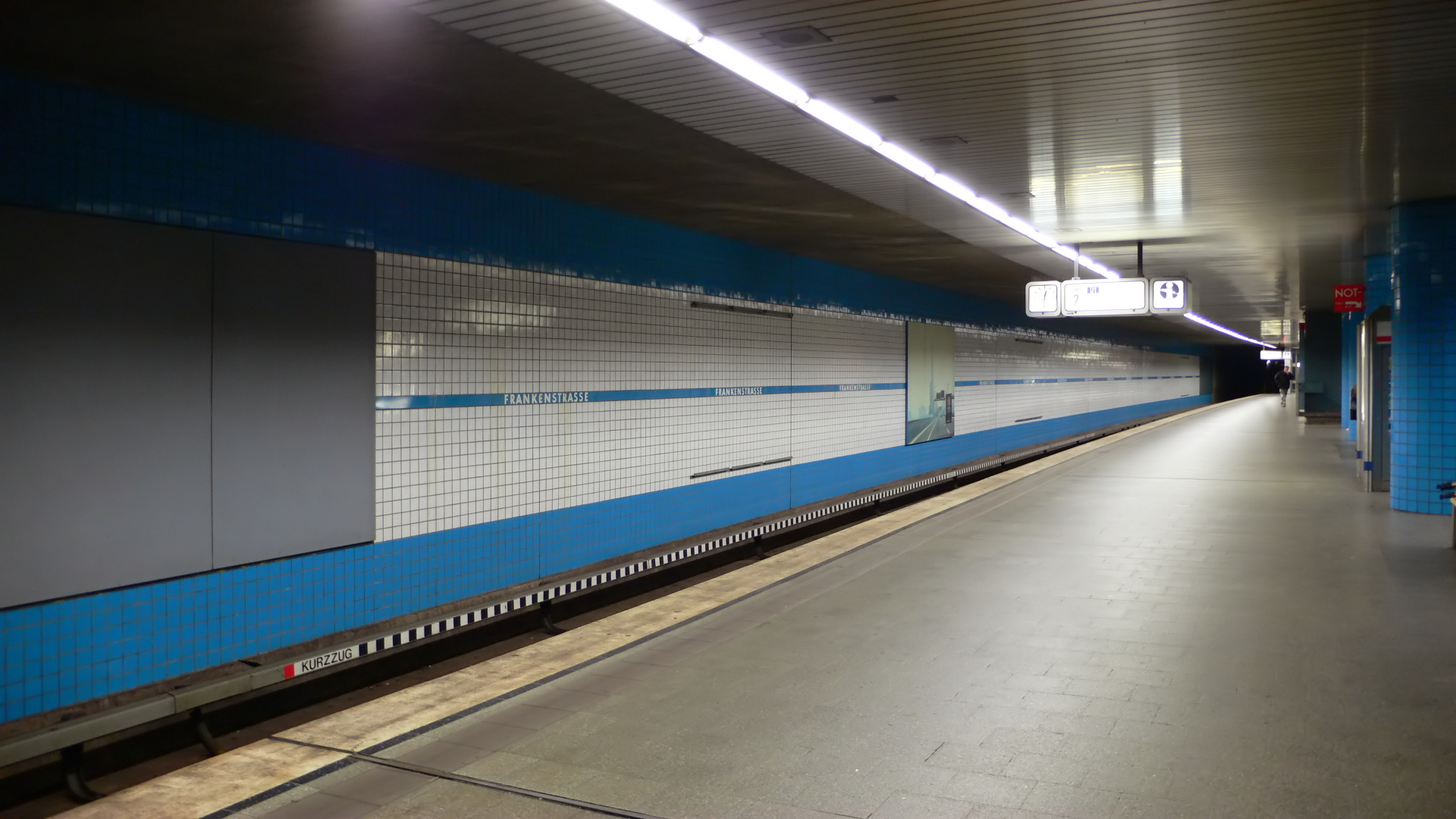

General information
- Location: Pillenreuther Str. 90459 Nürnberg, Germany
- Coordinates: 49.4299906°N 11.0868158°E
- System: Nuremberg U-Bahn station
- Operator: Verkehrs-Aktiengesellschaft Nürnberg
- Connections: Tram: Tiergarten – Worzeldorfer Straße; Bus: 45 Thon - Mögeldorf; 51 Frankenstraße - Kornburg; 58 Frankenstraße - Werderau / Wacholderweg; 65 Röthenbach - Mögeldorf; 67 Frankenstraße - Fürth Hauptbahnhof; 651 Frankenstraße - Schwand

Construction
- Structure type: Underground

Other information
- Fare zone: VGN: 100 and 200

History
- Opened: 18 June 1974

Services
Preceding station	Nuremberg U-Bahn	Following station
Maffeiplatz towards Fürth Hardhöhe	U1	Hasenbuck towards Langwasser Süd
Location

Frankenstraße station is a Nuremberg U-Bahn station on the U1 line. It offers interchange with the Tram line 5.
