= U1 (Nuremberg U-Bahn) =

Underground railway line in Nuremberg, Germany

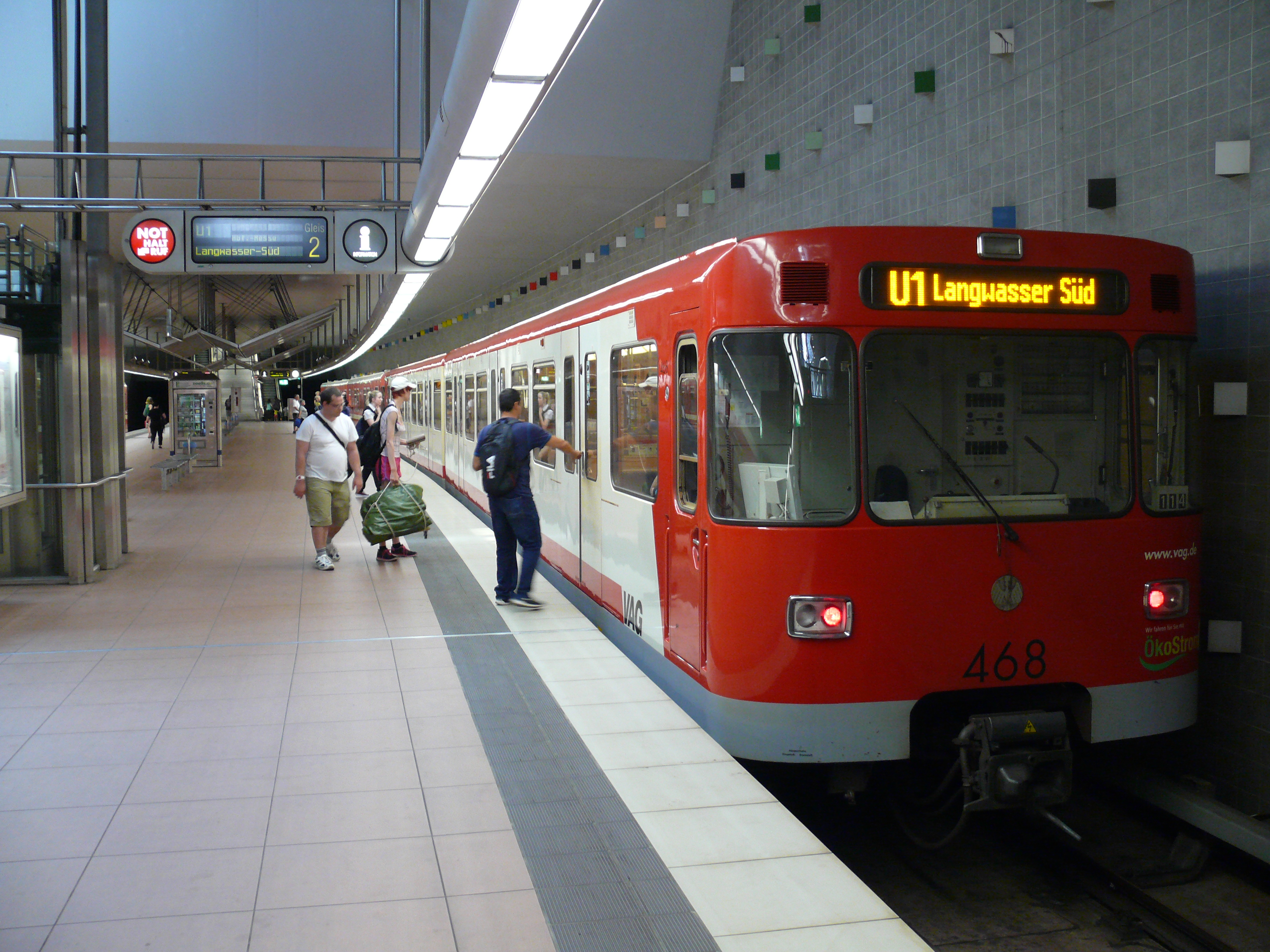

Overview
- Locale: Nuremberg/Fürth
- Termini: Langwasser Süd station; Fürth Hardhöhe station
- Stations: 27

Service
- Type: Rapid transit
- System: Nuremberg U-Bahn
- Operator: Verkehrs-Aktiengesellschaft Nürnberg
- Rolling stock: MVG Class A (formerly); VAG Class DT1 (1972–2023); VAG Class DT2 (1994–2022); VAG Class DT3-F (2011-2020); VAG Class G1 (since 2019)

History
- Work began: 20 March 1967
- Opened: 1 March 1972; 54 years ago
- Latest extension: 8 December 2007

Technical
- Line length: 18.5 km (11.5 mi)
- Number of tracks: two
- Track gauge: 1,435 mm (4 ft 8 1/2 in) standard gauge
- Electrification: 750 V DC third rail

The U1 is an underground line in Nuremberg. The first part of the line was opened on 1 March 1972. It is about 18.5 kilometres (11.5 mi) long and has 27 stations. The termini are Langwasser Süd in the southeast and Fürth Hardhöhe in the northwest. Until 11 December 2016 it shared tracks with the former booster line U11 between Eberhardshof and Messe. Those services are still run but no longer designated U11, instead being signed U1 like trains doing the full Langwasser-Hardhöhe run. Unlike U2 and U3 all trains are operated by a driver and there are no plans to automate U1.

== History ==
Unlike in Munich where line designations were based on previous tramway lines – line U6 was the first to open, but designated number 6 based on a previous tram line 6 – or Berlin where line numbers in the modern sense were only given out decades after the system opened and U1 and U2 do indeed represent the oldest part of the system, albeit with operational changes since their opening, the Nuremberg subway numbering system has always been historically based – meaning that the first line to be built was always (even in planning) designated U1, the second line U2 and so on. Consequently U1 is the first line of the Nuremberg subway line to start construction and to open for service. Construction on U1 started "from the outside in" at the new high-rise housing estate at Nuremberg Langwasser (an area that had previously served as campgrounds for visitors to the Nazi Party Rallying Grounds) and the route had initially been planned as an extension of the Nuremberg tramway network or a Stadtbahn-like subway-surface system before the city council of Nuremberg decided to build a "full" U-Bahn instead. This accounts for the tight curves along some sections of the track, as those parts of the line had been designed with tram, not subway standards.

The western part of U1 represents the third rail-based corridor on a nigh-identical alignment between the neighboring cities of Nuremberg and Fürth since 1835. First the Bavarian Ludwig Railway (locally often metonymically identified with its locomotive the Adler) which shut down in 1922 in the face of German hyperinflation and after competition from a parallel tram line became too fierce. And ultimately the subway which replaced tram service in 1981 after the decision by Nuremberg city council to gradually phase out tram service, replacing it with subways and buses. This in turn "forced" the city of Fürth to abandon their tramway network, as it had always been dependent on the link to Nuremberg and the infrastructure within Fürth itself was too small to maintain independent service – the city council of Fürth had never voted either way on whether to maintain tram service, but the decision of Nuremberg ultimately made that a moot point.

Initially the planned the terminus in Fürth would have been located at Fürther Freiheit, a central square which had already been the endpoint of the old Ludwig Railway (the historic station building had been torn down by the Nazis in 1938), but ultimately it was deemed more important to provide easy transfer at Fürth Hauptbahnhof to mainline trains. The western terminus of U1 long remained in central Fürth. After the line reached Fürth main station in 1985 it took another nine years for Fürth Stadthalle station and Fürth Rathaus station to extend the line further west and six more years passed before Fürth Klinikum station opened in 2004. Westward extension reached what appears to be a permanent end after the opening of the westernmost station in the system at Fürth Hardhöhe station in 2007. Further plans for expansion towards a station tentatively named "Kieselbühl" are no longer seriously pursued by political actors in Fürth, meaning the line has reached what appears to be its permanent length for the time being.

In 2010 the S-Bahn Nuremberg officially extended its line S1 to Bamberg main station via Fürth and Erlangen providing a second urban rail link between Nuremberg and Fürth (besides the U-Bahn) and two new interchange stations between U1 and S1 at Fürth Hauptbahnhof and what was then Unterfarrnbach station (S1) / Klinikum (U1). After a redesign of the S-Bahn station, the former "Unterfarrnbach" name was retired and the S-Bahn stop was renamed "Fürth Klinikum" in line with the U-Bahn stop in 2022.

== Line Design ==
The route begins at the Langwasser Süd station, at the southern end of which a four-track parking and sweeping system is located, and initially runs underground via the community building ("Gemeinschaftshaus") to Langwasser Mitte station. Thereafter, the route reaches the street level and henceforth runs in the median strip of Otto-Bärnreuther-Straße on the route of a planned in the 1950s tram line. In front of the next station Scharfreiterring the access to the underground depot is undercut. The station itself has four tracks, of which the two outer ones are used for passenger traffic and the two inner ones for entry and exit trips to and from the depot. The route continues past the railway stations Langwasser Nord and Messe until the last station of the first subway construction section, Bauernfeindstraße.

Between Messe and Bauernfeindstraße the subway passes through the tightest curve in the Nuremberg subway network used in scheduled service. This curve was still designed for a tram line before the decision to build a subway instead was taken, explaining the small curve radius. The maximum speed allowed in this area is 50 km / h. Afterwards, the route dips into a tunnel that was the longest between two underground stations in Nuremberg until the opening of the section Ziegelstein – Airport on the U2, and tunnels under the Südbahnhof area. Shortly after the Brunecker Straße, the track reappears on the surface and runs in a terrain cut to Hasenbuck station.

After the Hasenbuck station, the now underground route leads under the eponymous survey and the Katzwanger road to the station Frankenstraße and then runs under the Pillenreuther road to the station Maffeiplatz. The route continues from the Maffeiplatz under the Pillenreuther Straße to the Kopernikusplatz and reaches the station Aufseßplatz. This was prepared during construction on the underpass by another subway line (then called U3) by the tunnel tubes of the U1 are built so that the construction of the track tunnel is possible without major operational restrictions. The route continues under the tracks of the main station to the main train station under the station square, where the U1 meets the U2 and U3 for the first time.

Then the route leads in an elongated left bend under Königstraße to the Lorenzkirche train station and then under Adlerstraße, Josephs and Ludwigsplatz to the station Weißer Turm. This section of the route was the most technically demanding of the entire Nuremberg subway, as both the central hall of the main station and significant historic buildings of the old town are undercut. Running under the Jakobsplatz and the Ludwigstraße, the line of the U1 reaches the station Plärrer and meets there for the second time on the U2 and U3. The station is designed as a direction station, in the upper station level the trains go in the direction of Fürth (U1), Röthenbach (U2) and Gustav-Adolf-Straße (U3) and in the lower level direction Langwasser (U1), airport (U2) and Northwest Ring (U3). After the Plärrer station the U1 follows the historic Ludwigseisenbahn route (today however below the Fürther road), passes the stations Gostenhof, Bärenschanze and Maximilianstrasse and reaches in the height of the Raabstraße before the station Eberhardshof again the surface.

The station Eberhardshof itself, is located in the middle of the Fürther Straße. It is adjoined by the last parking and sweeping system of the U1 existing in Nuremberg. After crossing the Ringbahn, the route leads up the elevated railway line in a ramp construction to the first Muggenhof station. This spans the intersection Fürther Straße / Adolf-Braun-Straße / Sigmundstraße in full length and, like the station Stadtgrenze, has outer platforms. The route continues in the middle position of the Fürther Straße, before crossing the Frankenschnellweg in an S-Bahn and reaching the station located on a dam city boundary. This is already located on the city of Fürth, but is counted to the Nuremberg subway network, since its construction was completely funded by the city of Nuremberg.

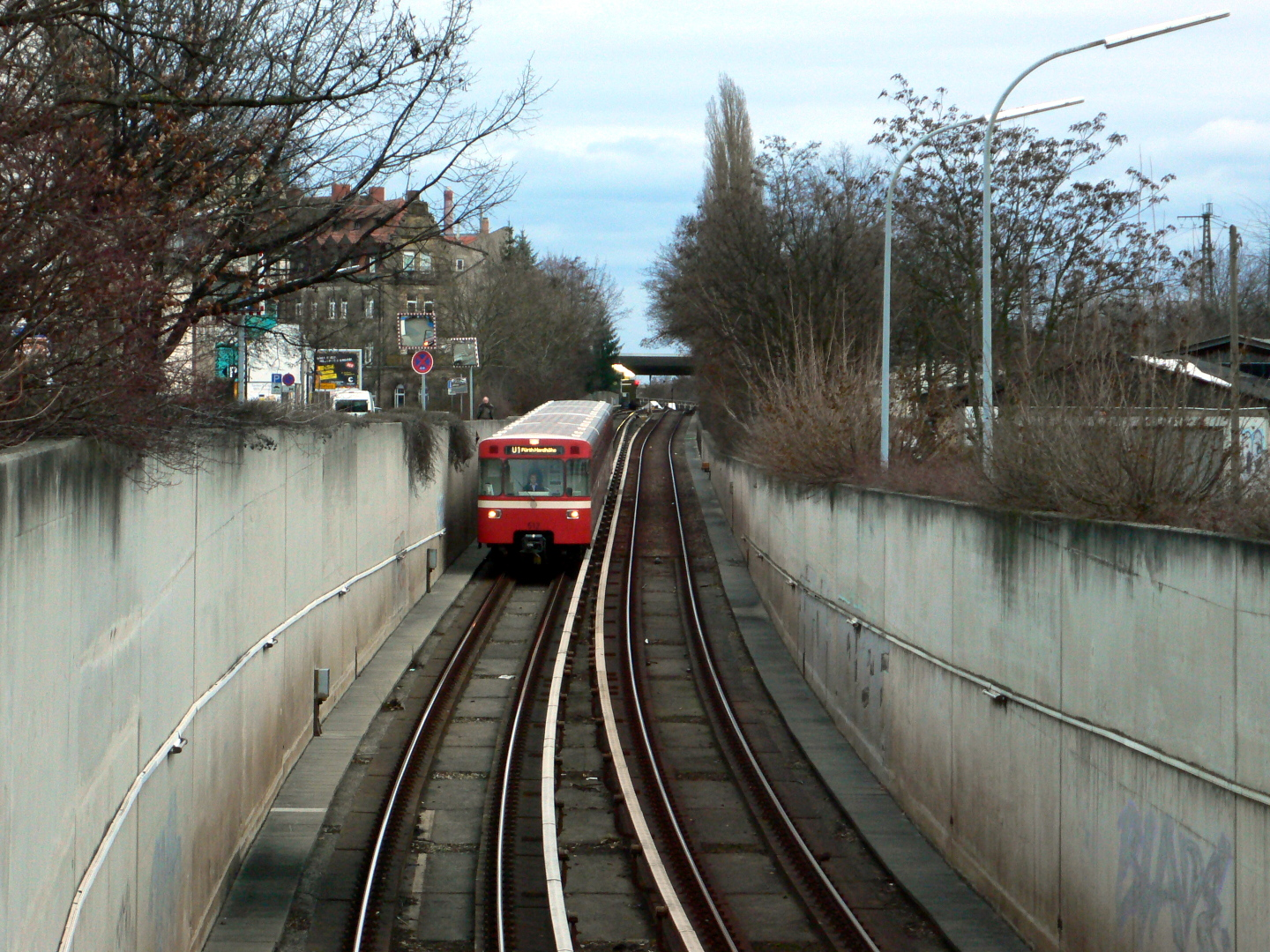
From Stadtgrenze to Jakobinenstraße

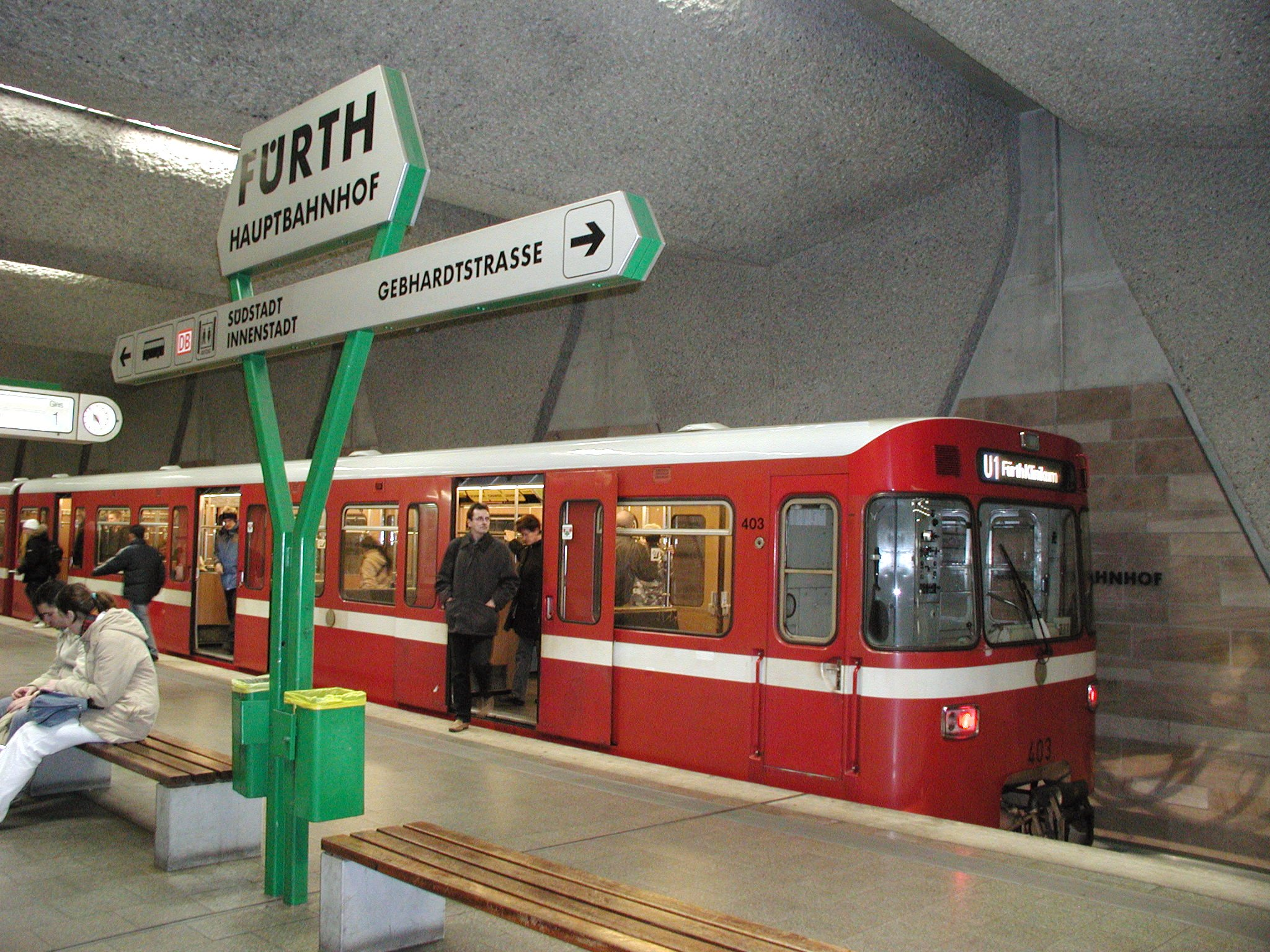
The U-Bahnhof Fürth Hauptbahnhof

After the railway station Stadtgrenze, the route initially runs parallel to the Hornschuch promenade on a causeway, then dives into the subsoil by means of a ramp construction and reaches the station Jakobinenstraße. Following Gebhardtstraße in the course of the underground station Furth Hauptbahnhof is reached under the station square, which was opened on 7 December 1985 for the 150th anniversary of the railway in Germany. Afterwards, the route swings to the north, runs under the Schwabacher Straße to the coal market and reaches the station Fürth Rathaus. The route then leads under the Gänsbergviertel and the Rednitz through the station Fürth Stadthalle and in the further course under the Scherbsgraben and Kellerberg to the station Fürth Klinikum. Afterwards, the Nuremberg-Bamberg railway line and the Würzburger Straße are underpassed before the line swings to the southwest and runs under the Komotauer Straße and reaches the terminus Fürth Hardhöhe. From the Fürth Rathaus station, digital displays were used for the first time at the platforms instead of the previous case-sheet advertisements.

== Stations ==
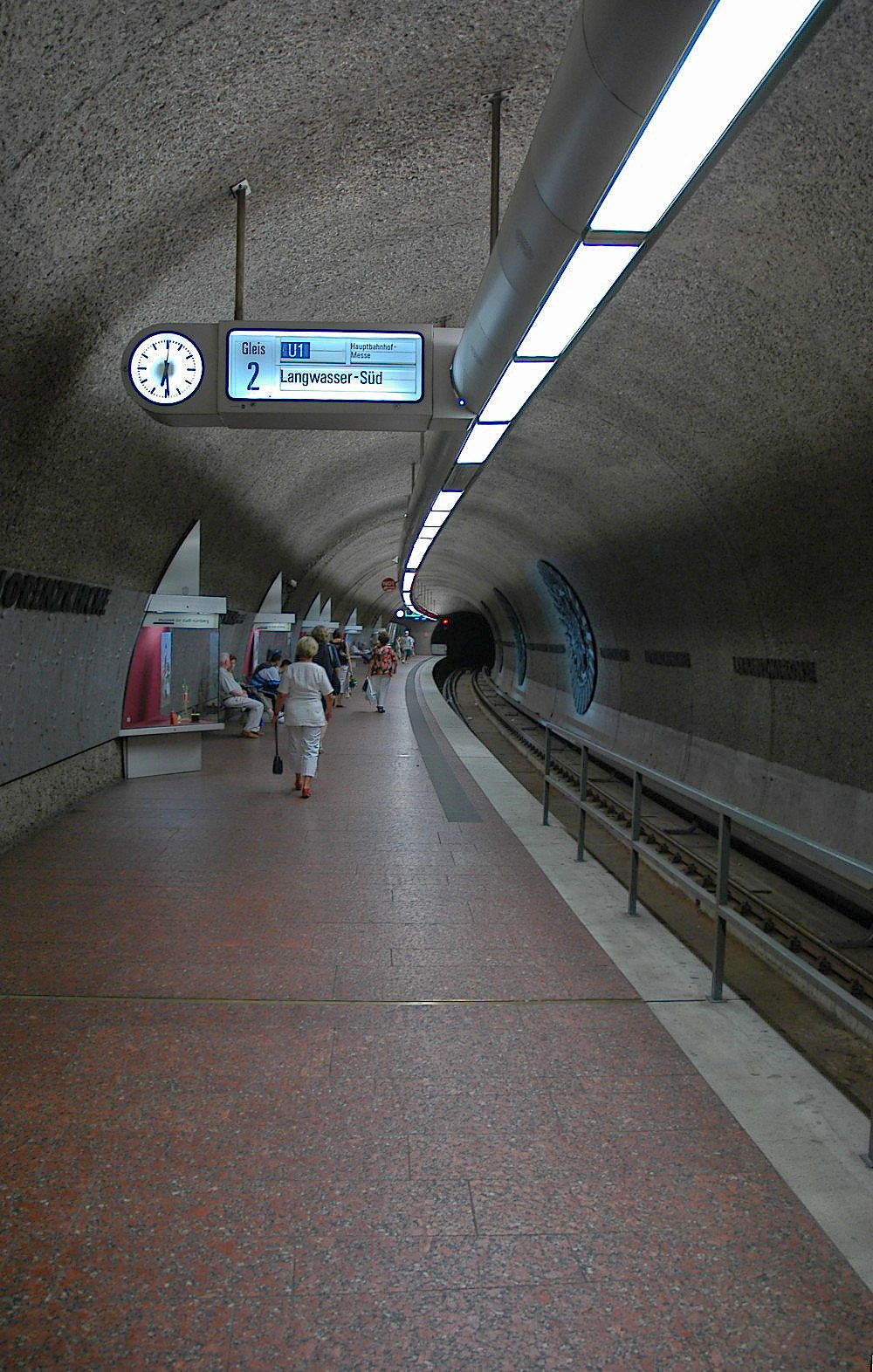
The undergroundstation Lorenzkirche

Stations	Transfers
U1
Langwasser Süd ↑	Bus
Gemeinschaftshaus	
Langwasser Mitte	Bus
Scharfreiterring ↑	Bus
Langwasser Nord	
Messe ↑	
Bauernfeindstraße	Bus
Technische Universität	planned
Hasenbuck ↑	
Frankenstraße	Nuremberg tramway Bus
Maffeiplatz	
Aufseßplatz ↑	Nuremberg tramway
Hauptbahnhof	U2 U3 S1 S2 S3 S4 R-Bahn Deutsche Bahn Nuremberg tramway Bus
Lorenzkirche	Bus
Weißer Turm	
Plärrer	U2 U3 Nuremberg tramway Bus
Gostenhof ↓	Bus
Bärenschanze	
Maximilianstraße	Bus
Eberhardshof ↓	
Muggenhof	
Stadtgrenze	Bus
Jakoninenstraße	Bus
Fürth Hauptbahnhof	S1 R-Bahn Deutsche Bahn Bus
Fürth Rathaus	Bus
Fürth Stadthalle	Bus
Fürth Klinikum	S1 Bus
Fürth Hardhöhe ↓	Bus
Fürth Kieselbühl	originally planned but de facto cancelled

Destination stations are bold. ↑ Means that this station is a southern destination, ↓ means that it is a western destination.

== Opening dates and construction costs ==
Logo U1

Opened Segment	Number of Stations	length	cost (nominal)	date opened	cost (inflation adjusted)	cost per km (inflation adjusted)
Langwasser Süd ↔ Bauernfeindstraße	7	3.7 kilometres (2.3 mi)	110 Million DM	1 March 1972	194,224,566€	52,493,125€
Bauernfeindstraße ↔ Frankenstraße	2	2.4 kilometres (1.5 mi)	59 Million DM	18 June 1974	92,285,569€	38,452,320€
Frankenstraße ↔ Aufseßplatz	2	1.1 kilometres (0.68 mi)		23 September 1975	money	
Aufseßplatz ↔ Weißer Turm	3	2.1 kilometres (1.3 mi)		28 January 1978	money	
Weißer Turm ↔ Bärenschanze	3	1.9 kilometres (1.2 mi)	money	20 September 1980	money	
Bärenschanze ↔ Eberhardshof	2	1.5 kilometres (0.93 mi)	money	20 June 1981	money	
Eberhardshof ↔ Jakobinenstraße	3	2.4 kilometres (1.5 mi)	money	20 March 1982	money	
Fürth Jakobinenstraße ↔ Fürth Hauptbahnhof	1	0.4 kilometres (0.25 mi)	48.06 million DM	7 December 1985	46,059,676€	115,149,190€
Fürth Hauptbahnhof ↔ Fürth Stadthalle	2	1.7 kilometres (1.1 mi)	money	4 December 1998	money	
Fürth Stadthalle ↔ Fürth Klinikum	1	1.3 kilometres (0.81 mi)	56.8 Million €	5 December 2004	73,702,890€	56,694,530€
Fürth Klinkum ↔ Fürth Hardhöhe	1	0.4 kilometres (0.25 mi)	30 million €	9 December 2007	37,153,875€	92,884,687€
Σ	27	18.9 kilometres (11.7 mi)	534 million €			

== Planned extensions ==
There are no detailed plans for any extension of the line. However, there have in the past been plans for an extension towards Fürth Kieselbühl, which are however conditioned on future infill development at that site which has been put off for the time being. On the other end of the line U1 was started at Langwasser and built "inwards" and Langwasser remains the terminus with no planned extensions. Branching extensions have been put forward variously but as of 2018 none are likely to be built for the foreseeable future. Occasionally there is debate about a link of some kind between the Nuremberg S-Bahn stop at Fischbach (currently served by S2) and the neighborhood of Langwasser, but as of 2022 it is unclear whether such a link would entail subway or tram extension and when or if it would be built at all. The intervall between Hasenbuck and Bauernfeindstraße is the longest on this line and one of the longest in the network as it passes through what is or used to be railyards. As part of that area is to be re-used for a new "Technical University of Nuremberg" there are proposals to build an infill station somewhere along this section of the line.

== Proposed ATC ==
As both lines U2 and U3 have been run driverless for over a decade, there are sometimes calls for the conversion of U1 to driverless operation. However, other than the new generation of trains ("G1") entering service from late 2019 onward being built with a removable driver cabin, no provision for driverless operation has been made as of 2020.

== Rolling stock ==
The U1 has seen service by all major series of rolling stock ever in regular operation on the Nuremberg U-Bahn. This includes the first generation VAG Class DT1, the newer VAG Class DT2, the newest VAG Class G1 (based on the Siemens Inspiro platform) and even the MVG Class A cars that have been used to alleviate temporary or long lasting rolling stock shortages in Nuremberg. The first series of VAG Class DT3 was initially designed for automatic operation only, as they have no permanent driver's cabin (an emergency use control panel is "hidden" in the front part of the cars during normal operations) and thus the older vehicles in this series can only be used on U2 and U3. However, a modified series, designated "DT3F" was introduced on U1 a few years after the introduction of the driverless DT3, the main difference being the addition of a driver's cabin. With the conversion of U2 to fully automatic operation in 2010, the remaining (manual operation only) DT2 and DT1 units were moved to U1 and have since been phased out as replacement G1 units become available.

== See also ==
- Nuremberg U-Bahn
  - U2 (Nuremberg U-Bahn)
  - U3 (Nuremberg U-Bahn)
- Nuremberg S-Bahn
  - S1 (Nuremberg)
  - S2 (Nuremberg)
  - S3 (Nuremberg)
  - S4 (Nuremberg)
