= Gemeinschaftshaus station =

Metro station in Nuremberg, Germany

Gemeinschaftshaus
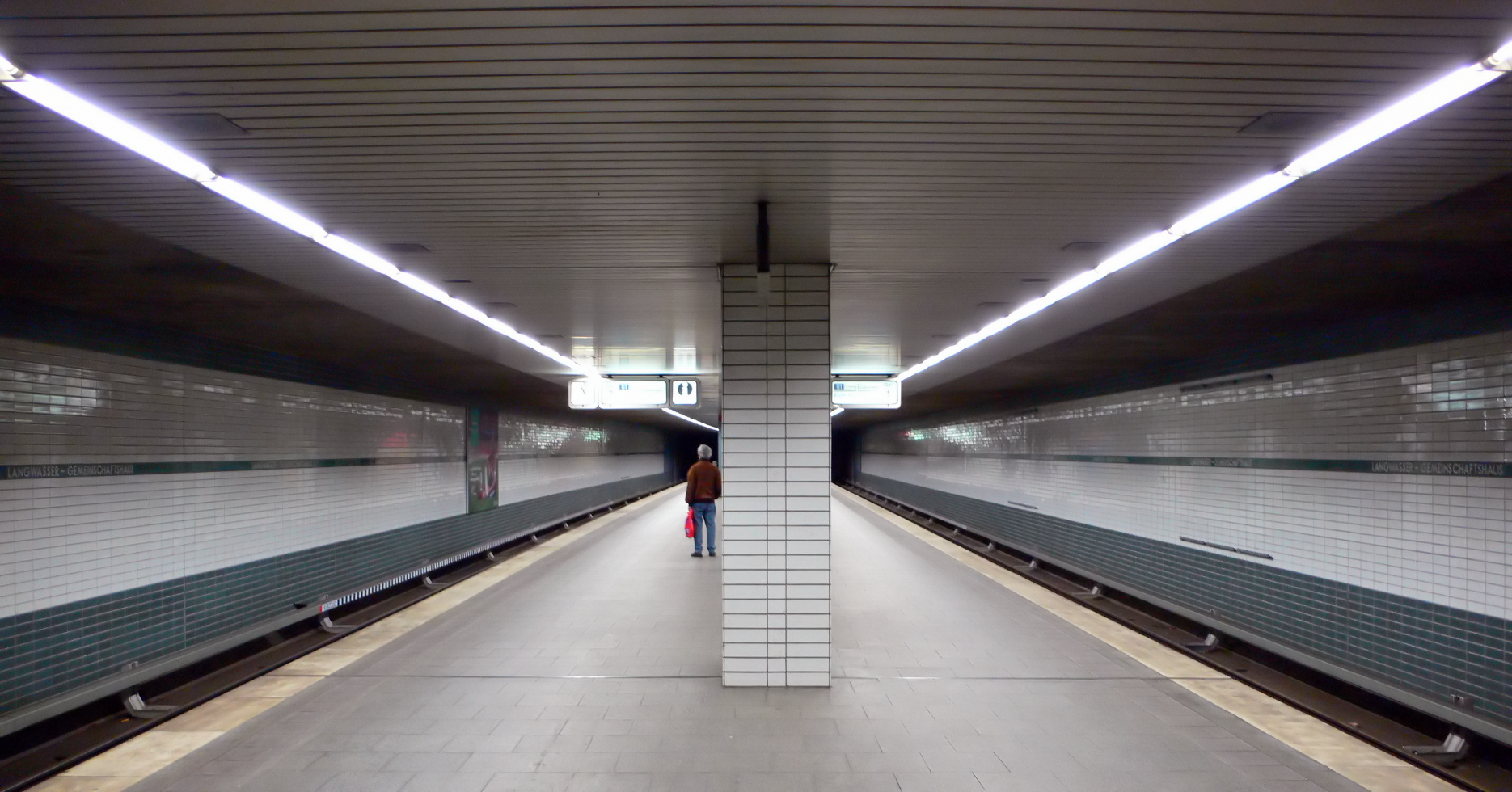

General information
- Location: Elisabeth-Selbert-Platz; 90473 Nürnberg, Germany
- Coordinates: 49.4014082°N 11.1363885°E
- System: Nuremberg U-Bahn station
- Operator: Verkehrs-Aktiengesellschaft Nürnberg

Construction
- Structure type: Underground

Other information
- Fare zone: VGN: 200

History
- Opened: 1 March 1972

Services
Preceding station	Nuremberg U-Bahn	Following station
Langwasser Mitte towards Fürth Hardhöhe	U1	Langwasser Süd Terminus
Location

Gemeinschaftshaus station is a Nuremberg U-Bahn station, located on the U1 line.
