= VAG Class DT3 =

German U-Bahn train type operated in Nuremberg

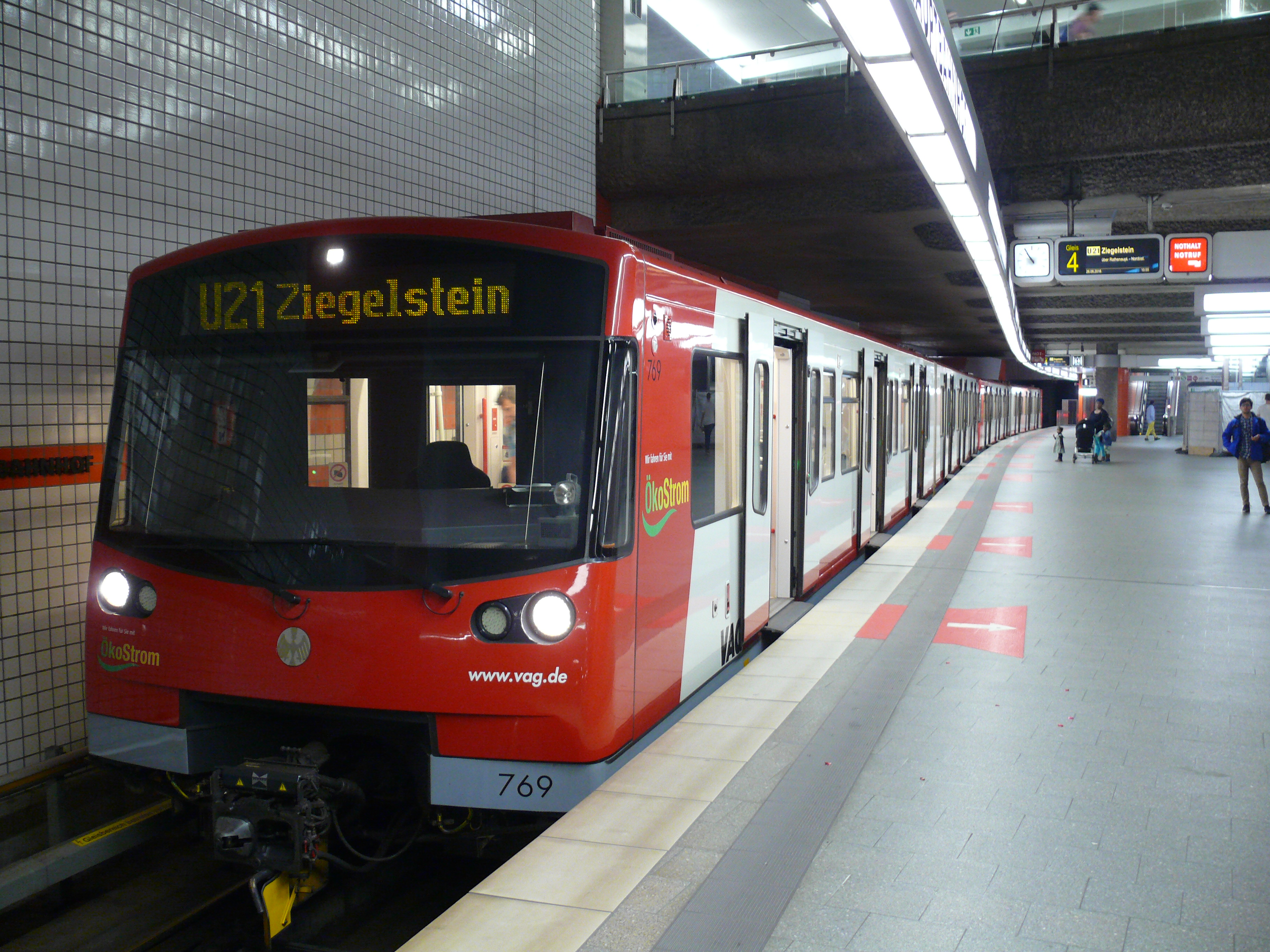
- A Class DT3-F train at Hauptbahnhof U-Bahn station in June 2016
- Manufacturer: Siemens
- Family name: Modular Metro
- Constructed: 2004–2011
- Number built: 92 vehicles (46 sets)
- Formation: 2 cars per set
- Fleet numbers: 701/702–763/764 (DT3)
- Capacity: 308 (82 seated)
- Operator: VAG

Specifications
- Car body construction: Aluminium
- Train length: 37.72 m (123 ft 9 in)
- Width: 2.90 m (9 ft 6 in)
- Doors: 3 pairs per side
- Maximum speed: 80 km/h (49.7 mph)
- Weight: 59.2 t (58.3 long tons; 65.3 short tons)
- Traction system: Siemens G750 D570/600 M5-1 IGBT–VVVF
- Power output: 1,120 kW
- Electric system: 750 V DC third rail
- Current collection: contact shoe pantograph (maintenance only)
- Braking systems: Electric brake, pneumatic brake, spring accumulator brake
- Safety systems: ATC, ATO, ATP
- Track gauge: 1,435 mm (4 ft 8 1/2 in)

The VAG Class DT3 is an electric multiple unit (EMU) train type operated by the Verkehrs-Aktiengesellschaft Nürnberg on the Nuremberg U-Bahn system. It is the first type of rolling stock on the Nuremberg U-Bahn that has gangways between the individual cars.

== Formation ==
Every DT3 train consists of two permanently coupled cars, forming a twin-unit. The cars are connected with a gangway, allowing passengers to walk into the adjacent car. The trains are equipped with automatic couplers, enabling operation of up to two units together to form a four-car train.

== Interior ==
Seating accommodation consists of transverse seating bays as well as folding seats. The trains have displays which show the name of the next station, and CCTV cameras. Passenger information screens and a passenger counting system are implemented in the DT3-F trains.

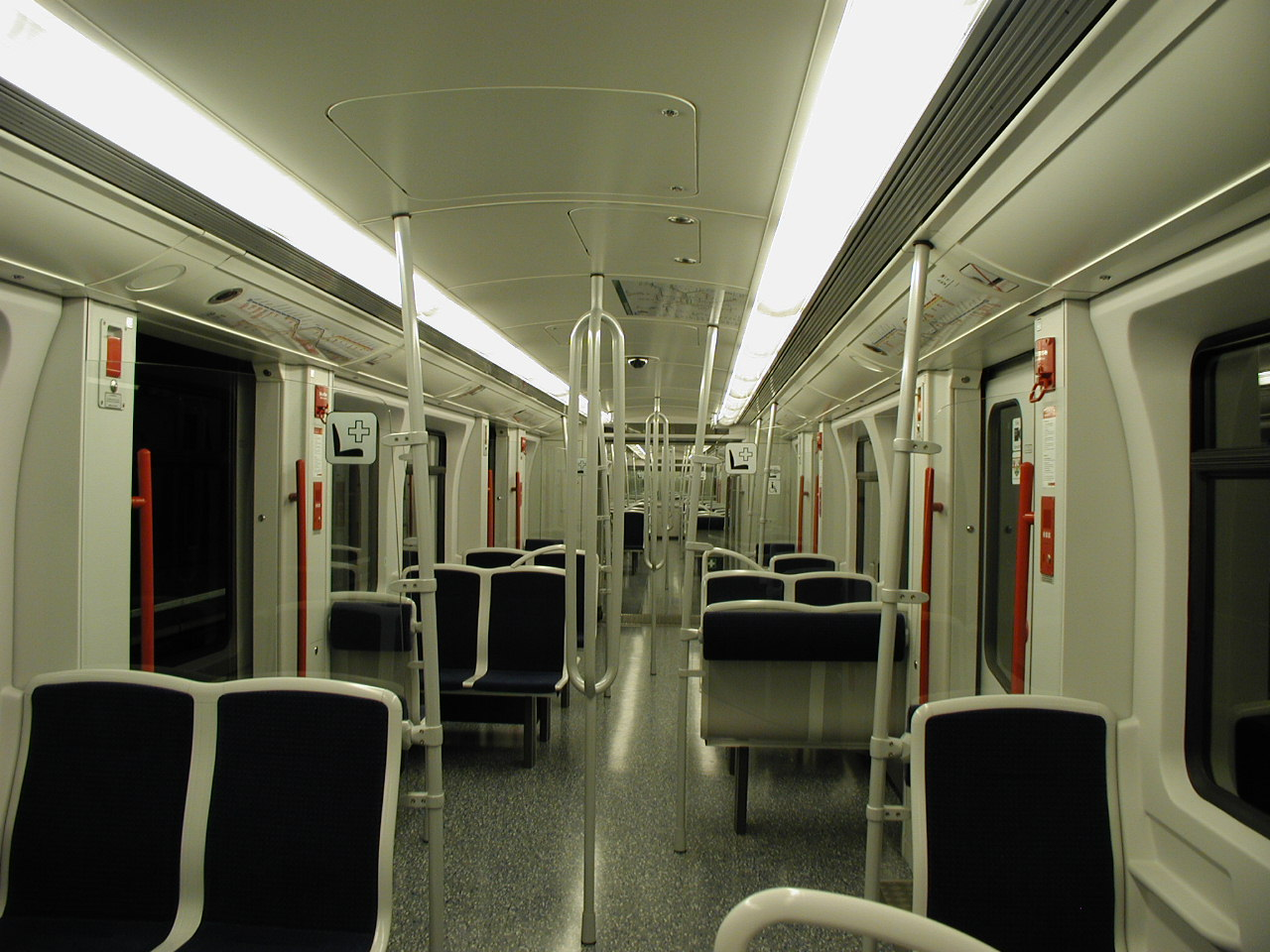
Interior view

== Technical specifications ==
The car bodies are made out of aluminium, and the trains are powered by three-phase-asynchronous motors. As they are used in automatic operation, the DT3 trains are not equipped with full driving cabs, but only with small concealed driving panels, which are used for maintenance. The DT3-F trains are equipped with full driving cabs, enabling them to be used on driver operated services on non-automated lines. The cabs are designed to be removed in case of a conversion for fully automated operation. Besides the power supply by contact shoes, every unit is also equipped with a pantograph, as parts of the maintenance facilities are electrified with overhead lines.

== History ==
The first unit was delivered in April 2004 as part of the "Rubin" project, which planned to introduce fully automated trains on the Nuremberg U-Bahn. Rubin is an acronym for Realisierung einer automatisierten U-Bahn in Nürnberg (Implementation of an automated U-Bahn in Nuremberg). Automated test running on line U3 began in January 2005. On May 4, 2008, the first DT3 trains entered automatic revenue service on line U3. Driverless operation was officially launched on June 14, 2008, two years later than anticipated. Originally scheduled for 2006, the official launch of driverless operation had to be pushed back to 2008 due to technical difficulties and mechanical problems, which resulted in the return of two prototype DT3 sets to the supplier Siemens. Fully automatic trial runs on line U2 began on January 13, 2009, while the trains were already in automatic revenue service on line U3.

=== DT3-F ===
A second batch of 14 DT3 trains was ordered in 2008. These units, classified as DT3-F, feature a full control cab for manual operation, but also can be operated fully automatic. First DT3-F units arrived in Nuremberg at the end of August 2010. The DT3-F trains entered service in May 2011. The "F" in the designation indicates the option of manual operation and means "Fahrer" (German for "driver").

== See also ==
- List of driverless trains
