= Trams in Nuremberg =

Overview of the tram system of Nuremberg, Bavaria, Germany

Coordinates: 49°27′N 11°05′E

Nuremberg tramway network
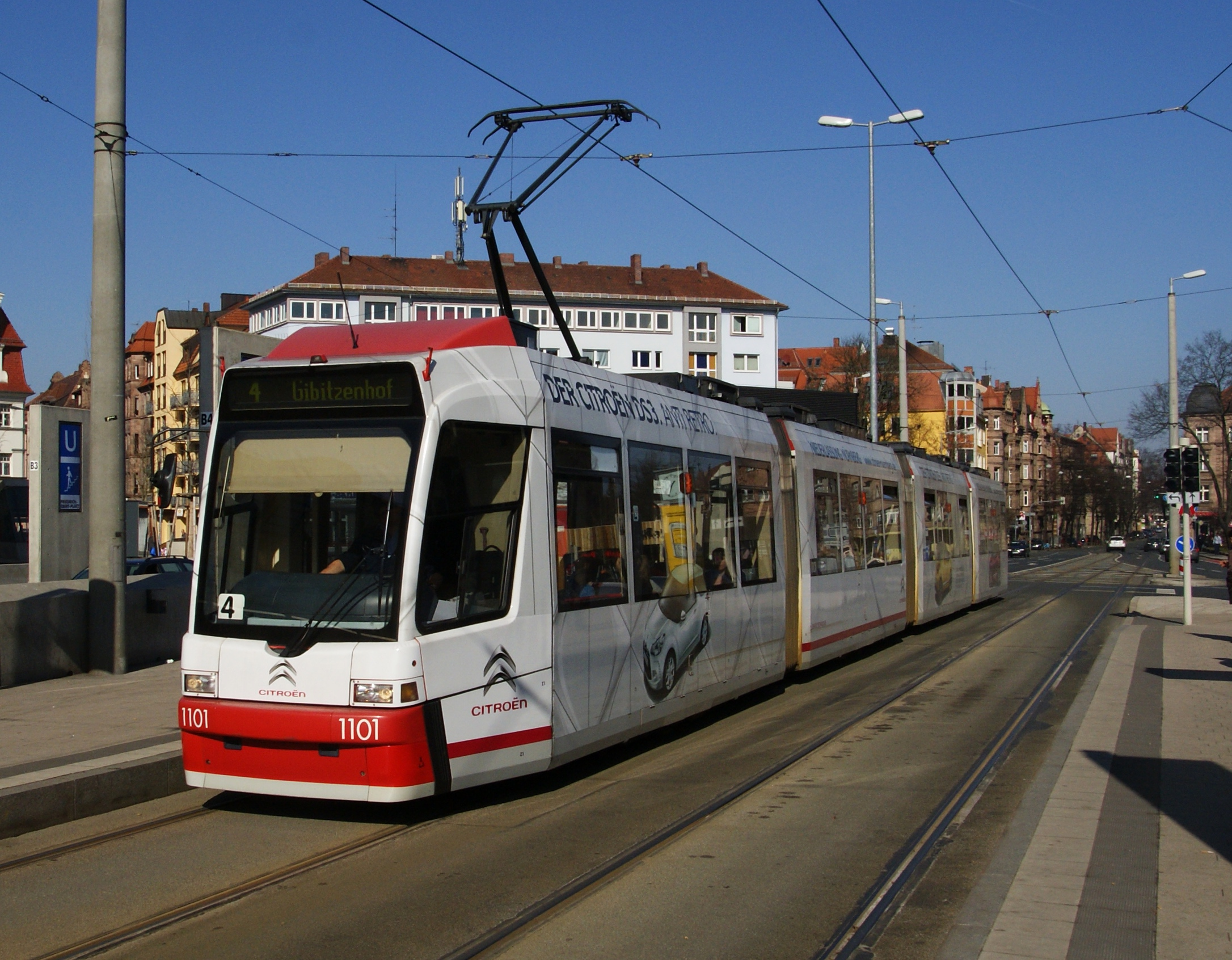
- A GT8N tram at Friedrich-Ebert-Platz, 2012

Operation
- Locale: Nuremberg, Bavaria, Germany

Statistics
Horsecar era: 1881–1898
- Status: Converted to electricity
- Track gauge: 1,432 mm (4 ft 8 3/8 in)
- Propulsion system: Horses
Electric tram era: since 1896
- Status: Operational
- Lines: 7
- Operator: Verkehrs-Aktiengesellschaft Nürnberg (VAG)
- Track gauge: 1,435 mm (4 ft 8 1/2 in) standard gauge
- Propulsion system: Electricity
- Electrification: 600 V DC
- Stock: 48
- Route length: 33 km (21 mi)
- Stops: 76
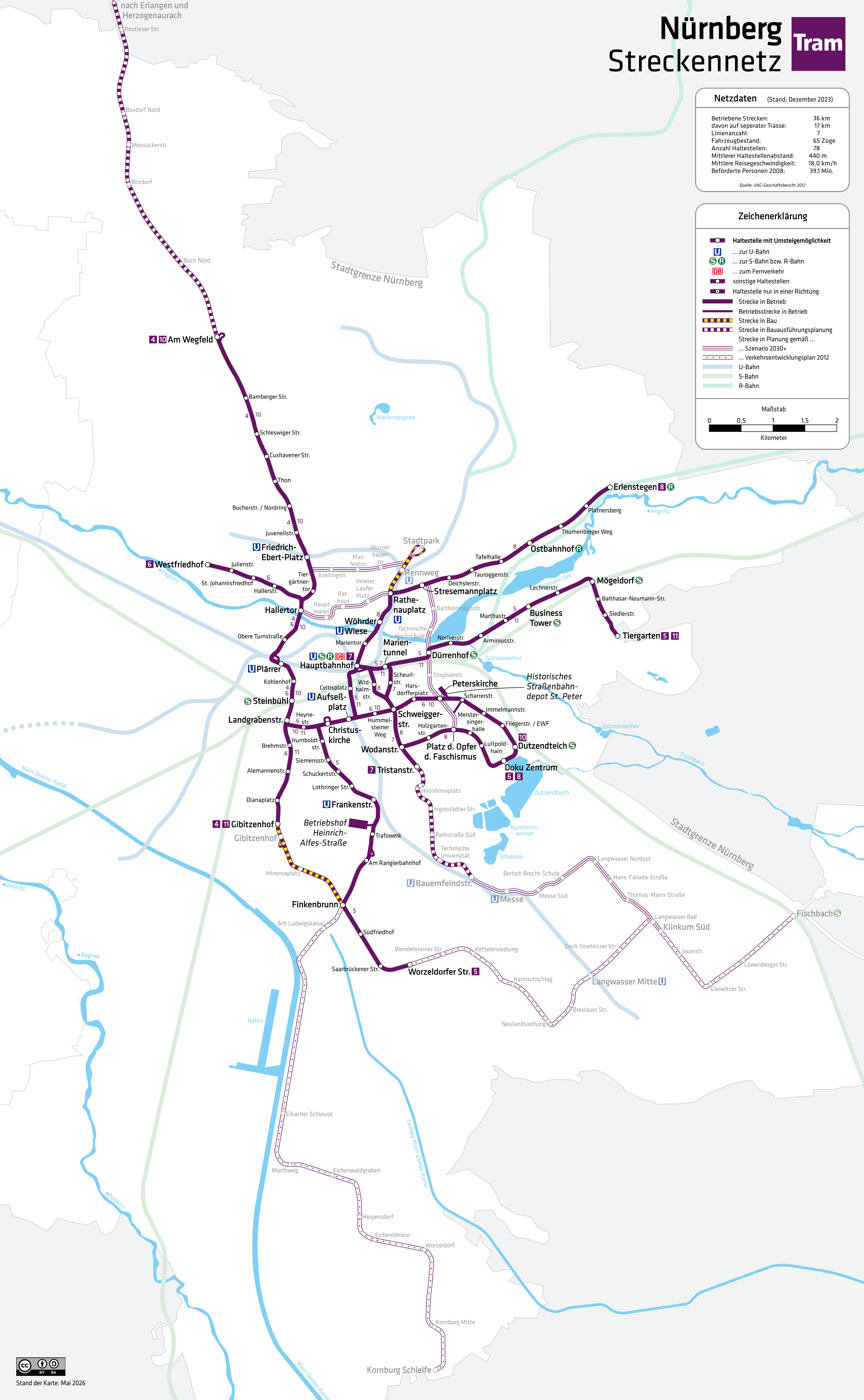
- Tramway network, 2012
- Website: https://www.vag.de/ VAG Verkehrs-Aktiengesellschaft Nürnberg (in German)

The Nuremberg tramway network (German: Straßenbahnnetz Nürnberg) is a network of tramways forming part of the public transport system in Nuremberg, a city in the federal state of Bavaria, Germany. The system reached the neighboring city of Fürth from its opening year 1881 to almost a century later when construction of the U1 subway line led to the withdrawal of tram service to and within Fürth. During that era and referring to it historically in literature or nostalgic activities, the system was known as “Nürnberg-Fürther Straßenbahn“ (Nuremberg-Fürth tramway). For example, a local association dedicated to preserving the history and heritage of the tram network as well as old rolling stock calls itself “Freunde der Nürnberg-Fürther Straßenbahn“ (friends of the Nuremberg-Fürth tramway) The system is planned to cross the municipal boundaries of Nuremberg once more, if and when the extension to Erlangen and from there to Herzogenaurach dubbed "Stadtumlandbahn" (or "StUB" for short) opens (see below).

The network is operated by Verkehrs-Aktiengesellschaft Nürnberg (VAG), which is a member of the Verkehrsverbund Großraum Nürnberg (VGN; Greater Nuremberg Area Transport Association). The VAG also operates the Nuremberg U-Bahn and local buses while the Deutsche Bahn AG operated Nuremberg S-Bahn also operates within VGN schedules and ticketing rules.

As of 2023, the network consisted of seven lines, running on a total operational route length of 38.4 kilometres (23.9 mi).

== History ==
The first horse-drawn tramline opened in Nuremberg on 25 August 1881.

Electrification came to the system when the first electric tramline opened on 7 May 1896. The entire system was electrified on 20 July 1898. Until the 1990s the track gauge was nominally 1,432 mm (4 ft 8 3/8 in), however, this figure is just 3 mm (0.12 in) from standard gauge and thus both figures are within each other's tolerances.

The system reached into the neighboring city of Fürth until 1981 (weeks ahead of the 100th anniversary of the system) when tram service was shut down in anticipation of the newly built subway line U1 replacing the service to Fürth - prior to that the trams to Fürth had been using the elevated line built for the U1 as a transitional service. This marked a particularly high-profile example of shutdowns of tram service on the network in the course of U-Bahn expansion. When the decision to build an U-Bahn (as opposed to converting the existing tram system into a Stadtbahn as other West German cities were doing at the time) was taken in the 1960s, the tram network was planned to be gradually replaced by subways and buses and shut down step by step. However, this decision was ultimately reversed and there have both been shutdowns (last along Pirckheimer Straße in 2011 – a consequence of the extension of U3) and expansions (last in 2016 towards the new northern endpoint "Am Wegfeld" in preparation for potential extension towards neighboring Erlangen) in the 2010s.

Both the decision to abandon tram service in favor of U-Bahn and bus service and its reversal were paralleled in Munich where many U-Bahn Munich lines replaced former tram lines (including the somewhat idiosyncratic numbering scheme based on those former tram lines and not the order of construction or geographic location) but the decision to abandon the tram system was ultimately reversed and the Munich tram network has since started expanding again. The particular politics of Bavaria played a significant role in this as Franconia whose largest city is Nuremberg often feels "left behind" by what it views as Old Bavaria centric politics by the "natural governing party" of Bavaria, the CSU. The city council of Nuremberg had already taken the decision to build a subway-surface system similar to that in Stuttgart on the advice of Stuttgart based traffic scientist Walther Lambert before reversing course after the Bavarian State government had assured a Nuremberg subway would be on financially equal footing to the Munich one (i.e. Get significant state funding) but refused to make any such assurances for a Stadtbahn. In a similar fashion, the decision to keep - and later expand - the tramway after all was also a product of political idiosyncrasies, as the city of Nuremberg "lent" new low-floor trams to the city of Munich embroiled in fierce debate about whether or not the Munich tramway was to have a future and if so in which form and the new more accessible vehicles were among the deciding factors in both cities in them keeping and even expanding tram service.

In 2020 the CSU candidate won the election for Lord Mayor of Nuremberg, but instead of a vote against tram service, the city council actually voted to decisively expand tram service in 2021. One of the first measures of this programme to be put into practice was the addition of the new lines 10 and 11 using existing infrastructure. This change took place with the December 2023 schedule change. On the map the planned new lines under this scenario are referred to with "2030+".

== Lines ==
The Nuremberg tramway network operated on six lines until 2011, when two tram lines were joined.

The network has 96 kilometres (60 mi) of track, with a total route length of 37 kilometres (23 mi), of which 33 kilometres (21 mi) is operational route. Of the tram's operational route, 41% is segregated from other traffic, with the other 59% representing trams operating in the street with other automobile traffic. Lines have been numbered in such a way as to not overlap with the U-Bahn Nuremberg ever since the opening of U1, meaning line-number 1 ceased to be used when U1 opened, line-number 2 ceased to be used when U2 opened and so on. Thus the current lines are numbered 4 thru 8 and 10-11. The number 9 is currently (late 2023) not assigned to any line. It was last used for lines serving the now shut down tracks in Pirckheimer Straße.

The Nuremberg tramway network consists of the following seven lines:

Line	Route (crossing points and termini)	Stops	Route length	End to end travel time	Average distance between stops	travel speed
Nuremberg tramway	Gibitzenhof – Landgrabenstraße – Hallertor – Friedrich-Ebert-Platz – Am Wegfeld	19	8.3 km (5.2 mi)	28 min	436.8 m (1,433 ft)	17.2 km/h (10.7 mph)
Nuremberg tramway	Tiergarten – Mögeldorf – Marientunnel – Hauptbahnhof - Aufseßplatz - Frankenstraße - Südfriedhof	26	11.7 km (7.3 mi)	30 min	450 m (1,480 ft)	23.4 km/h (14.5 mph)
Nuremberg tramway	Doku-Zentrum – Dutzendteich – Schweiggerstraße – Christuskirche – Landgrabenstraße – Hallertor – Westfriedhof	22	8.3 km (5.2 mi)	30 min	377.3 m (1,238 ft)	16.6 km/h (10.3 mph)
Nuremberg tramway	Tristanstraße - Hauptbahnhof	6	2.8 km (1.7 mi)	8 min	466.7 m (1,531 ft)	21 km/h (13 mph)
Nuremberg tramway	Doku-Zentrum – Wodanstraße – Schweiggerstraße – Hauptbahnhof – Rathenauplatz – Erlenstegen	21	7.5 km (4.7 mi)	27 min	357.1 m (1,172 ft)	16.7 km/h (10.4 mph)
Nuremberg tramway	Dutzendteich - Am Wegfeld	26	10.6 km (6.6 mi)	34 min	407.7 m (1,338 ft)	18.7 km/h (11.6 mph)
Nuremberg tramway	Tiergarten - Gibitzenhof	20	9.1 km (5.7 mi)	29 min	455 m (1,493 ft)	18.8 km/h (11.7 mph)

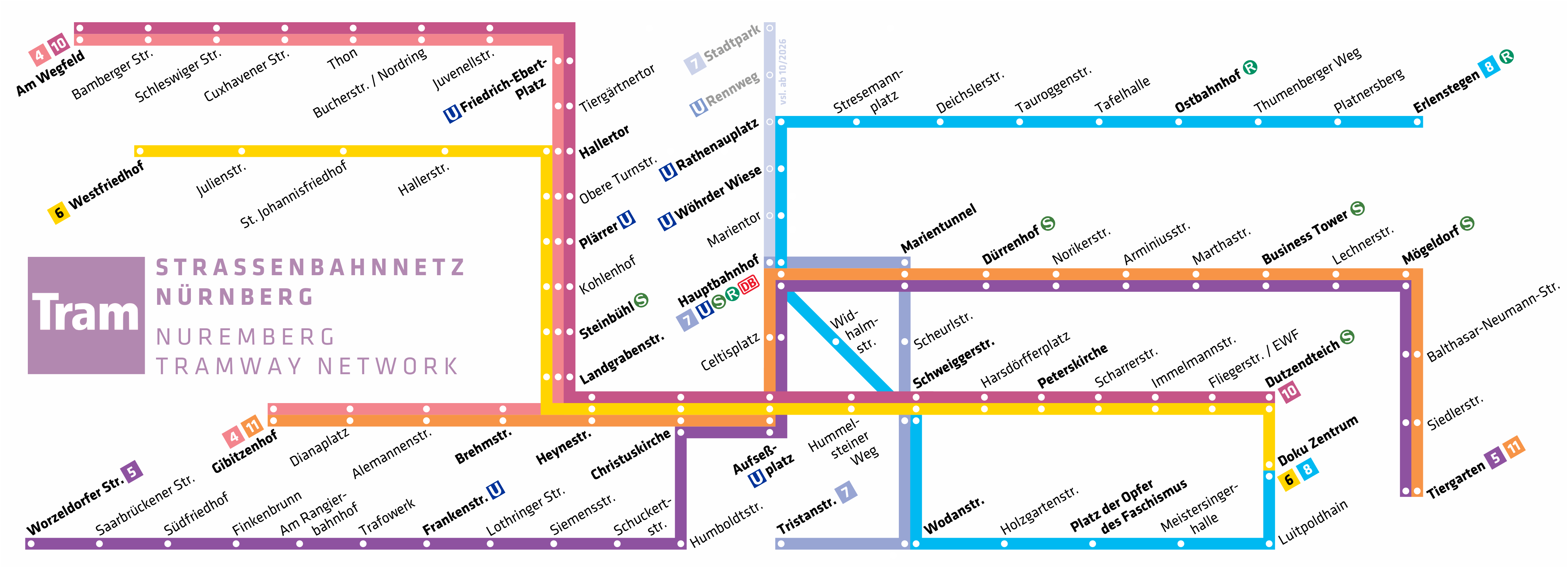
line network

== Interchanges with other systems ==
Most tram stops are also served by local buses.

=== Interchanges with U-Bahn Nuremberg ===
There are two points in the Nuremberg transportation network which are served by all subway lines, Plärrer station and Nuremberg Central Station. The former offers interchange between subway lines U1 through U3 and tram lines 4, 6 and 10 while the latter offers interchange between those subway lines and tram lines 5, 7, 8 and 11. The Plärrer has been a central traffic hub in Nuremberg for centuries and the Bavarian Ludwig Railway (metonymically known locally by the name of its first steam locomotive "Adler"), Germany's first railway, terminated there from 1835 to 1922. Historically up to 13 different tram lines served the Plärrer.

Other interchange points between subway and tram include Wöhrder Wiese station (U2 and U3 to tram line 8) and Rathenauplatz station (U2 and U3 to tram line 8) along the main U2/U3 trunk where the two driverless subway lines overlap to a combined 100 second headway. There is also an interchange at Friedrich-Ebert-Platz station between U3 and tram lines 4 and 10. All interchanges between U2 and the tram network are also served by U3.

Interchanges between subway line U1 exist at Aufseßplatz station (tram lines 5, 6, 10 and 11) as well as Frankenstraße station (tram line 5).

=== Interchanges with S-Bahn Nuremberg and other local trains ===
Besides the central interchange station Nürnberg Hauptbahnhof where all S-Bahn lines and almost all regional trains serving Nuremberg stop (the Gräfenberg railway serves only Nuremberg Northeast station) there are also a handful of interchange stations between the tram system and Nuremberg S-Bahn as well as between the tram system and regional trains.

Passengers can change between tram lines 4 and 6 and the S-Bahn lines S1 and S2 at Nürnberg-Steinbühl station. Nürnberg-Dutzendteich station meanwhile allows connections between S2 and tram lines 6 & 10.

Tram line 5 offers several connections to the S-Bahn at Nürnberg-Dürrenhof station (S1 and S2) as well as to S2 at Nürnberg-Ostring station (within walking distance of tram stop "Business Tower"). Furthermore, tram line 5 serves Nürnberg-Mögeldorf station which is also served by S2.

Due in part to being not electrified services along the Right Pegnitz line (Nuremberg Cheb railway) are branded as regional trains instead of S-Bahn. There are interchanges between the tram line 8 and regional train services along that line at Nürnberg Ostbahnhof ("Nuremberg East(ern) Station") and Erlenstegen. In the course of planned Nuremberg S-Bahn expansion, the Right Pegnitz line is to be electrified and integrated into the S-Bahn Nuremberg network at some future date. The expansion might also include infill stations with further S-Bahn/Tram interchanges.

== Expansion plans ==
After a 2016 ballot measure in Erlangen, the section to am Wegfeld is planned to be extended to Erlangen and from there to Herzogenaurach in a roughly L-shaped line. Herzogenaurach previously had a connection to mainline rail, but it was shut down in the 1980s, leaving it one of southern Germany's biggest cities without a rail connection. With the establishment of a new Nuremberg Technical University (de:Technische Universität Nürnberg) on former railway real estate in the new borough "Lichtenreuth" there are plans to extend the tram into the new neighborhood. The still extant section of track towards "Stadtpark" which was taken out of revenue service in the course of U-Bahn extension is also planned to regain regular passenger service. In the course of long term traffic planning the so called "Nahverkehrsentwicklungsplan 2025" (named after the year in which projects were to be finished, not the year it was issued - the term roughly translates as "(local) public transit development plan" and is commonly abbreviated NVEP 2025) was commissioned in 2011 and ultimately published in 2013 to do cost benefit analysis of numerous proposed and discussed U-Bahn and Tram projects. Among the projects with the best benefit cost ratio per the legal requirements in Germany was one crossing the northern Old Town, serving Nuremberg City Hall and roughly replacing that section of current bus line 36. Other projects included an extension of the tram network to Kornburg in the South or serving Nuremberg's port on the Main-Danube Canal. However, as of 2021 few of those projects are being seriously considered right now. In 2021 the committee on transportation of the Nuremberg City Council passed a plan for numerous upgrades and expansions of the tram network, including the introduction of new lines "10" (Dutzendteich-Plärrer-Am Wegfeld) and "11" (Gibitzenhof-Hauptbahnhof-Mögeldorf) offering new direct routes on existing infrastructure, as well as the reactivation of the infrastructure towards the Stadtpark for passenger service and extensions in Minervastraße and Brunnecker Straße which will provide redundancy in the case of blockage of routes in addition to more capacity and service. The plans are to be put into practice during the 2020s with an end goal of an overall public transit ridership of 200 million p.a. in Nuremberg in 2030.

== Rolling stock ==
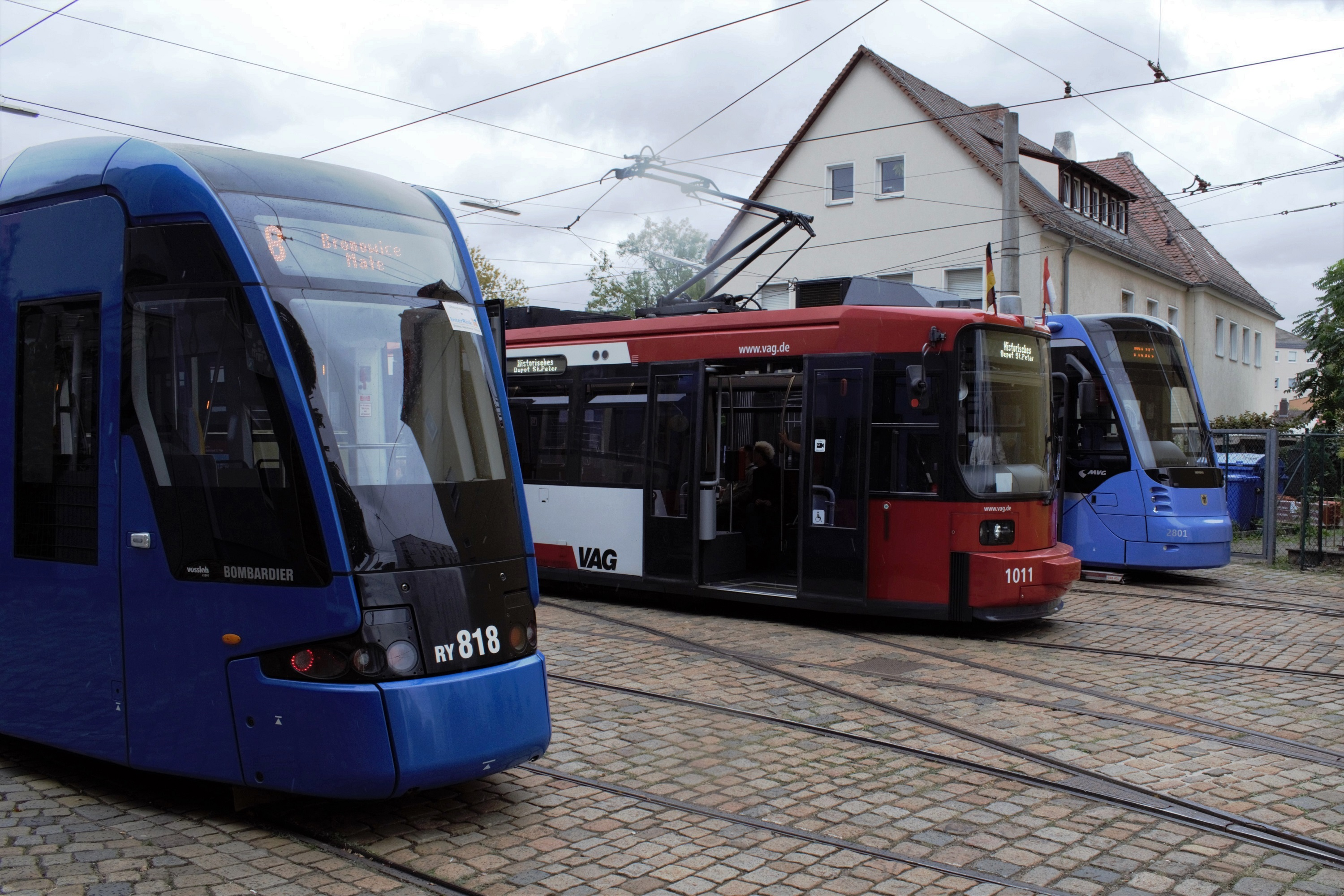
Flexity Classic, refurbished GT6N, and Avenio T1.6 at the historic St. Peter tram depot in August 2018

As of 2019, Nuremberg operates a fleet of 48 trams. In 2018, VAG borrowed one Avenio T1 from Munich, as well as one Bombardier Flexity Classic from Kraków in preparation for a tender for new trams. In November 2019, VAG ordered 12 Avenio trams from Siemens Mobility, with an option for 75 more, and entry into service scheduled for 2022. The first Avenio entered regular operations on December 21, 2022.

Model	Year built	Number	Image
Adtranz GT6N	1995-1996	14	
Adtranz GT8N	1999-2000	26	
Stadler GTV6 (Variobahn)	2006-2007	8	
Siemens Avenio	2020-present		

== See also ==
- Nuremberg U-Bahn
- Nuremberg S-Bahn
- Trams in Germany
- List of town tramway systems in Germany
