= Fürth Hardhöhe station =

Metro station in Fürth, Germany

Fürth Hardhöhe
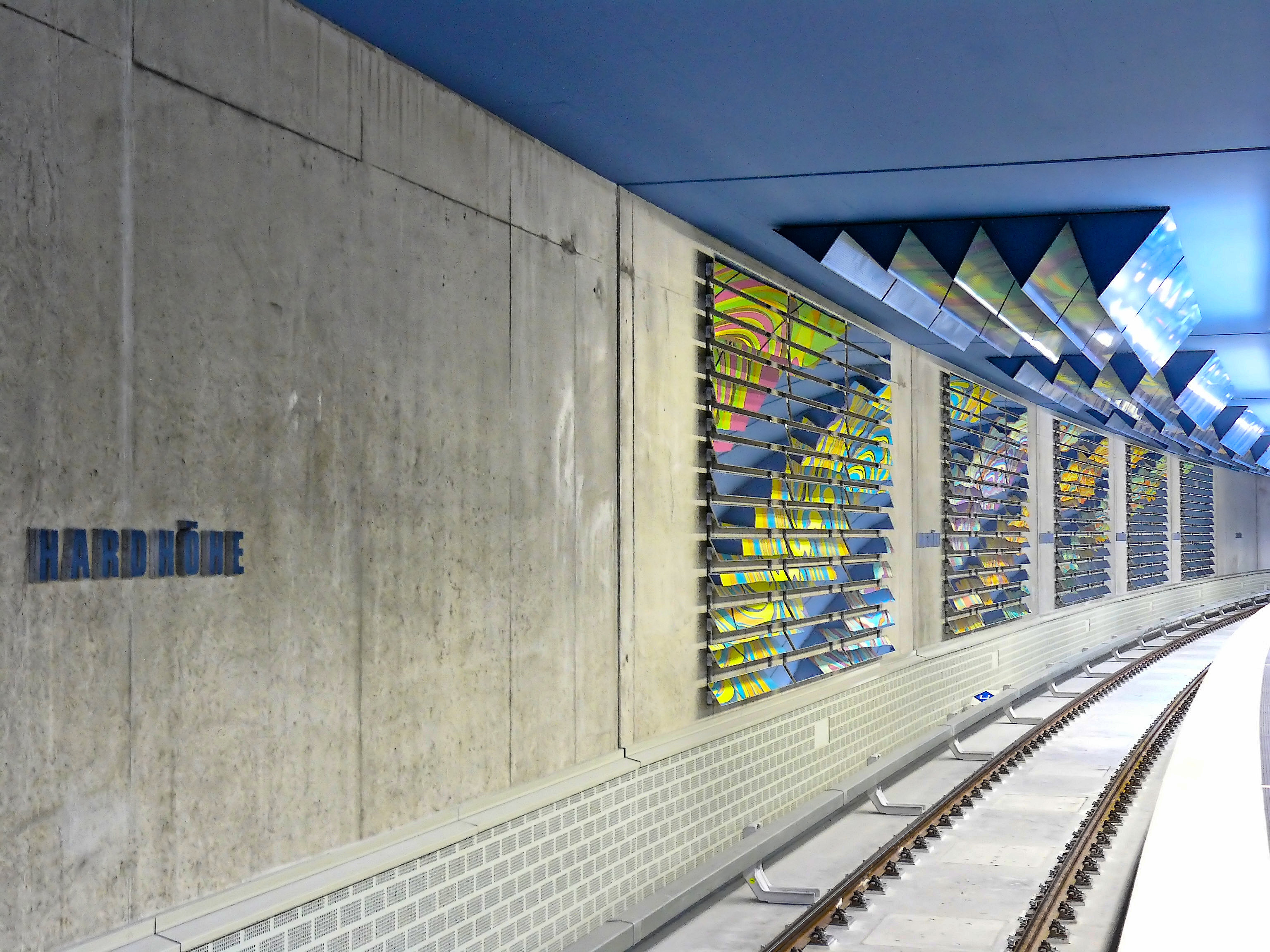

General information
- Location: Komotauer Str. 90776 Fürth, Germany
- Coordinates: 49.4804024°N 10.957266°E
- System: Nuremberg U-Bahn station
- Operator: Verkehrs-Aktiengesellschaft Nürnberg
- Connections: Bus: 171 Vach Nord - Hardhöhe - Oberfürberg

Construction
- Structure type: Underground

Other information
- Fare zone: VGN: 200

History
- Opened: 18 February 2007

Services
| Preceding station | Nuremberg U-Bahn | Following station |
|---|---|---|
| Terminus | U1 | Fürth Klinikum towards Langwasser Süd |
Location

Fürth Hardhöhe station is a Nuremberg U-Bahn station located on line U1 in Fürth, and was opened on 8 December 2007. This station is the western terminus of line U1. Counting Stadtgrenze station which straddles the municipal boundary and is indeed named after it, it is the seventh station in Fürth to open. As of 2022 U1 is the only line to reach beyond the boundaries of Nuremberg, but 20 of its 27 stations are entirely inside Nuremberg. The remaining 22 stations served by U2 and/or U3 are all in Nuremberg, too.

== History ==
The site of the current station was used as an airfield by a local aviation related company during World War II when settlement for the most part hadn't yet reached the area. As the former airport at Nuremberg-Marienberg (opened 1933) had been destroyed in the war and the old Fürth airfield had been taken over by the American military, this so-called "Industrieflughafen" ("industrial airport") served as the primary civilian airport of the Nuremberg area from 1950 until the current airport could be opened in 1955. A small plaque in the U-Bahn station access tunnels commemorates this history. The area first saw major residential construction in the period 1935-1938 which also explains some of the roads named after places in East Prussia or Silesia by the Nazi regime. After the war, the airport was an impediment to further development in the area and as soon as the new airport opened, longstanding plans to alleviate the housing shortage were put into practice in the latter 1950s to build housing in the new "Hardhöhe" neighborhood (while the name dates to medieval times, previously the housing in the area was sometimes referred to with terms harkening to the airfield). There were plans to extend the Nürnberg Fürther Straßenbahn to the area via Hardstraße and Soldnerstraße (the street layout even includes space for a - never built - balloon loop to this day) but those never came to fruition before the construction of the new subway necessitated the end of all tram service in and through Fürth in 1981. As the subway kept expanding further westward, it was instead decided to connect the neighborhood to the subway instead and the new station opened in December 2007.

== Future plans ==
There were at various times plans for an extension to a newly built stop tentatively called “Kieselbühl“, which however were called "shelved" by local media as early as 2008 and appear unlikely to come to fruition in the foreseeable future as of 2021. If the terminus does indeed prove to be permanent, U-Bahn construction in and through Fürth would've come to an end some 25 years after the opening of the first line to cross the municipal boundary opened in 1982.
