= Langwasser Süd station =

Metro station in Nuremberg, Germany

Langwasser Süd
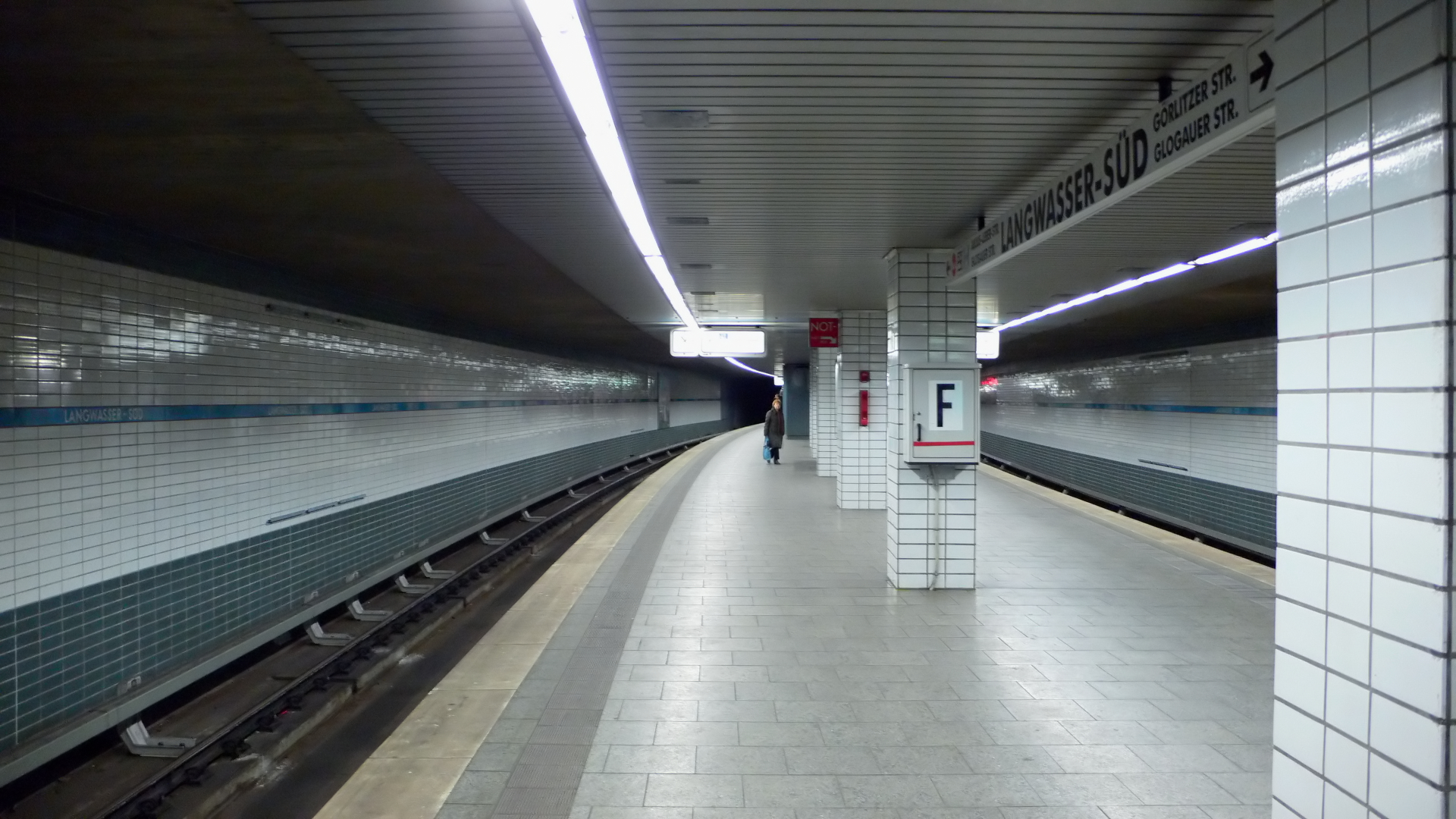

General information
- Location: Julius-Leber-Str. 90473 Nürnberg, Germany
- Coordinates: 49.3986197°N 11.1410509°E
- System: Nuremberg U-Bahn station
- Operator: Verkehrs-Aktiengesellschaft Nürnberg
- Connections: Bus: 54 Langwasser Süd - Brunn; 59 Langwasser Süd - Winkelhaid Bf.

Construction
- Structure type: Underground

Other information
- Fare zone: VGN: 200

History
- Opened: 1 March 1972

Services
Preceding station	Nuremberg U-Bahn	Following station
Gemeinschaftshaus towards Fürth Hardhöhe	U1	Terminus
Location

Langwasser Süd station is a Nuremberg U-Bahn station, located on the U1 line.
