= Lob Gott getrost mit Singen =

German Lutheran hymn

- Lutheran hymn
- English: "Praise God, praise God with singing"
- Text: Bohemian Brethren
- Language: German
- Based on: Te Deum
- Melody: Originally secular
- Composed: 1532
- Published: 1544

"Lob Gott getrost mit Singen" (literally: Praise God confidently with singing) is a Lutheran hymn in German, a paraphrase of the Latin Te Deum, by the Bohemian Brethren. The hymn is part of the current Protestant hymnal. The hymn was translated into English as "Praise God, praise God with singing". The hymn tune was used for several hymns in different languages, denominations and centuries.

== History ==
The text of "Lob Gott getrost mit Singen" was written by the Bohemian Brethren, in six stanzas as a loose paraphrase of the Latin Te Deum. It has been arttibuted to Johann Horn from Domascbitz near Leitmeritz in Bohemia, a bishop of the Brethren. He published the song in a 1544 hymnal, with a 1532 melody which was originally secular, "Entlaubet ist der Walde".

The hymn appears in the German Protestant hymnal Evangelisches Gesangbuch as EG 243. It is part of several other hymnals and songbooks. The song was translated into English as "Praise God, praise God with singing", providing four stanzas.

== Tune and musical settings ==
The tune was first secular, and appeared in 1532 with the text "Entlaubet ist der Walde". It was first associated with a hymn in 1535 in Nürnberg. The hymn tune was also used for the hymn for Pentecost "O komm, du Geist der Wahrheit" by Philipp Spitta. In English, "Let me be Thine forever" is a translation of Nicolaus Selneccer's 1688 hymn "Lass mich dein sein und bleiben" (lit: Let me be Yours and remain it) by Matthias Loy. Other hymns to the melody include "Through Jesus' Blood and Merit", a free translation of Simon Dach's "Ich bin bei Gott in Gnaden", and "Redeemed, restored, forgiven" by Henry Williams Baker. In German, Petronia Steiner wrote a Catholic offertory hymn "Wir weihn der Erde Gaben" (We devote the gifts of the earth) to the tune in 1945. In 1989, a few weeks before the fall of the Berlin Wall, Klaus-Peter Hertzsch, a pastor in Eisenach, used the melody for a song for a wedding of a relative: "Vertraut den neuen Wegen" (Trust the new ways).

Adam Gumpelzhaimer composed a four-part motet. Torsten Sterzik wrote a cantata, with the same cantus firmus but different vocal settings for the six stanzas, and two instrumental settings for winds. It was published by Strube-Verlag. Johannes Petzold wrote a four-part setting in 1961, published by Merseburger Verlag in 1963, and left sketches for other settings for both voices and organ. Michael Schopen composed a chorale prelude for organ.

Slightly paraphrased as Lobt Gott getrost mit Singen, the beginning is the title of a songbook of 51 popular songs from Evangelisches Gesangbuch, intended for use in services and especially senior citizens' homes.
