= Wir weihn der Erde Gaben =

Christian hymn

- Catholic offertory hymn
- English: We dedicate the gifts of the earth
- Occasion: Offertory
- Written: 1945
- Text: by Petronia Steiner
- Language: German
- Composed: 1832
- Published: 1975

"Wir weihn der Erde Gaben" (We dedicate the gifts of the earth) is a Christian offertory hymn with text by Petronia Steiner to the melody of the 1529 "Lob Gott getrost mit Singen". It appeared in the first edition of the Catholic hymnal Gotteslob and is part of its second edition. Several composers wrote settings for use in church.

== History ==
The text "Wir weihn der Erde Gaben" was written by Petronia Steiner in 1945, for the offertory during mass. She was born Elisabeth Steiner in 1908 in Venningen, The Palatinate, and became a Dominican nun in 1928, adopting the name Petronia. From 1942, she worked for a new hymnal for the Diocese of Speyer. She became the director of a new school of higher education for girls in Speyer, then called Nikolaus-von-Weis-Schule, in 1953 and remained in the position until 1974. In 1976, she became Superior General (Generaloberin) of the "Institut St. Dominikus Speyer" institution.

The melody was derived by Michael Töpler in 1832 from an older tune, published in 1526. The hymn was included in the first edition of the Catholic hymnal Gotteslob as GL 480 in 1975. Revised in 1993, it was retained for the second edition of the hymnal in 2013 as GL 187, in the section "Gesänge zur Gabenbereitung" (Chants for offertory).

== Melody ==
The tune was first secular, and appeared in 1532 with the text "Entlaubet ist der Walde". It was first associated with a hymn in 1535 in Nürnberg. It was used for the Bohemian Brethren's "Lob Gott getrost mit Singen", a loose paraphrase of the Latin Te Deum. Johann Paul Zehetbauer composed a four-part setting, with the melody in the alto, for a collection Lieder und Chorsätze zum Kirchenjahr (Songs and choral settings for the liturgical year), published by Christophorus Verlag. Peter Planyavsky wrote settings for three and four voices in 2006, published by Doblinger. A version with chorale prelude and choral setting was written by Carsten Klump for an ecumenical collection of hymns from the Protestant and Catholic hymnals, Ökumenisches Orgelbuch, working for both "Lob Gott getrost mit Singen" and "Wir weihn der Erde Gaben".
