= Frieda Fronmüller =

German church musician (1901–1992)

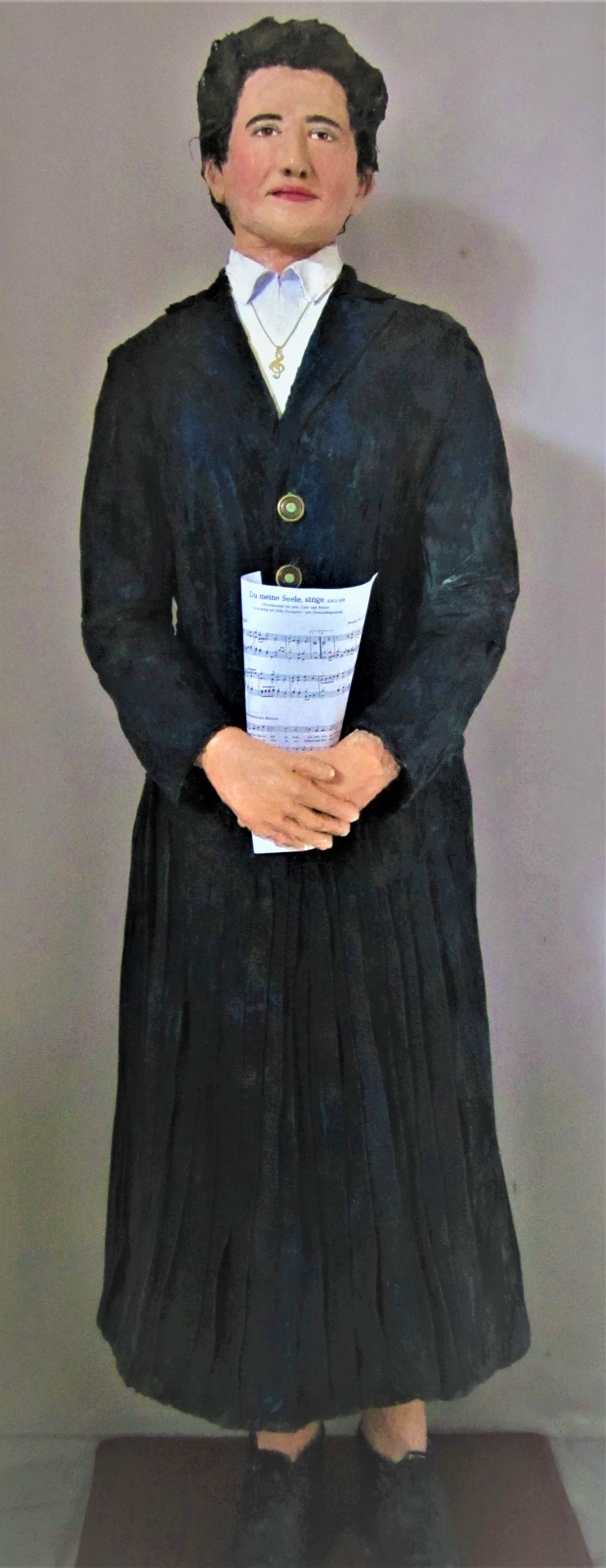
- Papier-mâché sculpture
- Born: Friederike Helene Emma Fronmüller; 8 September 1901; Lindau, Kingdom of Bavaria, German Empire
- Died: 13 February 1992 (aged 90); Nuremberg, Bavaria, Germany
- Education: Nürnberg Conservatory
- Occupations: Organist; Choral conductor; Composer
- Organizations: St. Michael, Fürth
- Title: Kirchenmusikdirektorin
- Awards: Order of Merit of the Federal Republic of Germany
- Website: www.gabriellatucci.it

Friederike Helene Emma Fronmüller (8 September 1901 – 13 March 1992) was a German Lutheran church musician and composer, who published as Frieda Fronmüller.

== Life and work ==
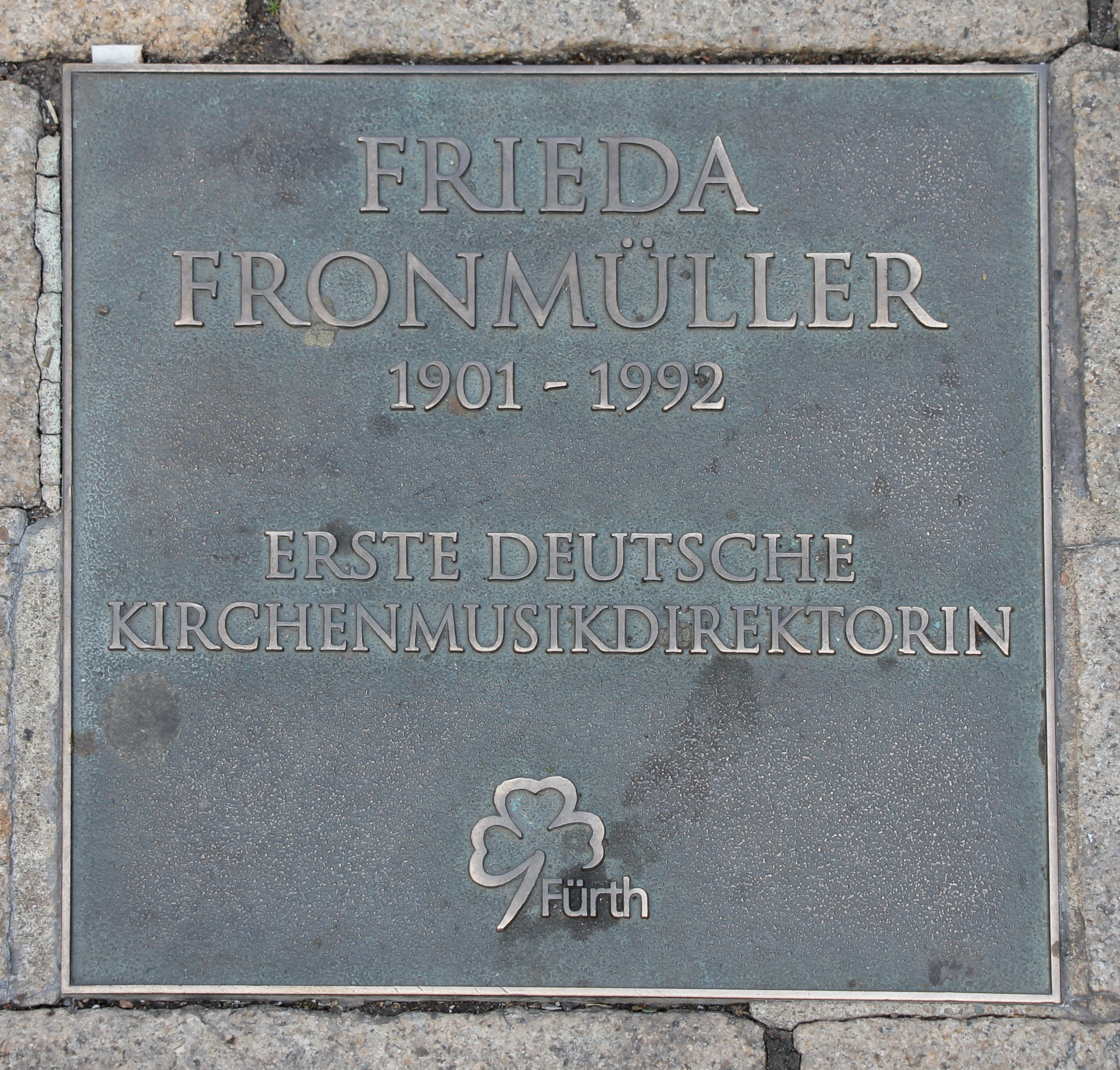
Plaque for Frieda Fronmüller on the Ehrenweg in Fürth

Born in Lindau, Fronmüller was a daughter of Paul Fronmüller, who in 1914 became pastor of St. Michael in Fürth, Bavaria, and remained on the post until 1935. She received private music lessons, and the studied music in Leipzig and from 1925 to 1930 at the Nürnberg Conservatory, where she graduated with distinction.

In 1923, during her studies, she became organist at the Fürth church, in 1932 also choral conductor. She held both posts until her retirement in 1964. In 1955, she was the first woman who was awarded the title Kirchenmusikdirektorin. She was honoured in 1966 with the Schulmusikpreis of Fürth, and in 1971 with the Order of Merit of the Federal Republic of Germany.

Fronmüller composed sacred cantatas, motets and songs, as well as chamber music. Her chorale cantatas for choir and brass became popular and were performed often. Her melody to Philipp Spitta's 1827 hymn "Freuet euch der schönen Erde" appears in the Protestant hymnal Evangelisches Gesangbuch as EG 510, as one of few melodies by a woman.

Fronmüller died in Nuremberg, aged 90.
