= Jacob Hirschorn =

American writer (1829–1906)

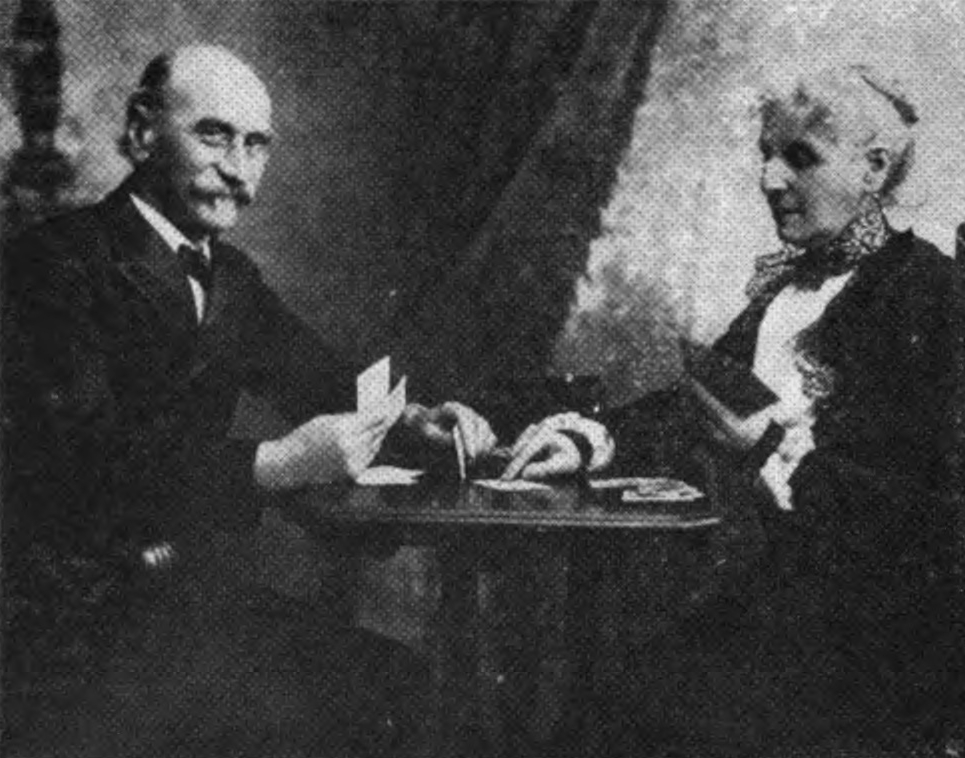
Hirschorn playing pinochle with his wife, 1890s

Jacob Hirschorn (May 19, 1829 in Fuerth, Bavaria – February 2, 1906 in St. Louis, MO) was a Jewish-American immigrant from Germany who served in the U.S.-Mexican War and wrote a dramatic memoir entitled "The Mexican War. Reminiscences of a Volunteer" from which the following information and quotations are taken.

Hirschhorn immigrated to the United States at age of 16, leaving his sister and widowed mother behind. He frequented a cafe on Broadway in New York where "the best class of French and German" drank cognac. There he met a French Count who recruited him to his Company B, 1st Regiment, New York Volunteers, as his protégé. The Count, who was Captain of the company, arranged for this although Jacob—whom he repeatedly called "Bon Garçon"—was under age.

They soon set sail and trained on an Island 200 miles from Vera Cruz, embarked again and joined a fleet of U.S. warships in Veracruz, Veracruz. They disembarked and attacked Vera Cruz from the south, amid American bombardment: "So awful a sight, but still grand, I have never seen, especially at night...fired from huge mortars on the frigates and line ships." The city surrendered after two days and the Stars and Stripes replaced the Mexican flag.

After some days camped under trying conditions they moved inland and faced Santa Anna's 20,000 troops entrenched on fortified heights. They scaled these and the assault succeeded--"the Mexicans fled 'vamoosed' as they call it"—but only after many American casualties. Hirschorn describes other difficult battles.

Because he could converse in German, French, and English, young as he was he was put in charge of a quartermaster's wagon train to obtain provisions for the Regiment, which was not being resupplied from the U.S. They then mounted an assault on Mexico City.

The initial attack on Chapultepec Castle was mounted by a unit called "Forlorn Hope" because none was expected to return. "We advanced two hundred strong. I omitted to say, that I volunteered to join. Under a terrible fire of artillery and muskets...we approached the wall...It was a terrible sight to see our brave fellows drop from the ladders, shot."

Successful there, they advanced to the city. "The Mexicans fought bravely, we forced them back however...opposed by the retreating enemy, who defended every foot of ground stubbornly and who were nobly assisted by hundreds of Mexican ladies, who from the tops of their houses...were pouring boiling water, boiling oil, rocks, anything they could lay their hands on, upon the very much exposed heads of our boys."

After the war was won the Regiment sailed for New Orleans, where Jacob was infected with Yellow fever and was taken to "La Charité' hospital, where I was tenderly cared for by one of the good sisters." The sister apparently took the opportunity to convert him, but he respectfully resisted. He rejoined his regiment and was honorably discharged in New York City, which "gave us a splendid and very enthusiastic reception and a silver medal for each soldier. We left New York 1200 strong and we returned about 260."

Because of his knowledge of French and German he was put in the quartermaster corps and did an excellent job as forager in Mexico. After he recovered, he returned to New York and settled in Providence, Rhode Island, where he married a daughter of Solomon Pareira, leader of the Jewish congregation, who had ten children. In Providence, Hirschorn became the secretary-treasurer of the Congregation Sons of Israel formed in 1855, and occupied himself in the hosiery and embroidery business.

Hirschorn's died on Feb. 2, 1906. His grave is in the New Mount Sinai Jewish cemetery in St Louis, where it is listed in a route among the most important sites at the cemetery.
