= Vertraut den neuen Wegen =

1989 sacred Song with lyrics by Klaus-Peter Hertzsch

- Christian hymn
- Written: 1989
- Text: by Klaus-Peter Hertzsch
- Language: German
- Melody: "Lob Gott getrost mit Singen"
- Composed: 1529
- Published: 1544

"Vertraut den neuen Wegen" (literally: Trust the new ways) is a Christian hymn in German. It was written by Klaus-Peter Hertzsch as occasional poetry for a wedding in East Germany in 1989, shortly before the fall of the Berlin Wall. The text is focused on new ways and trust in God. It is sung to the 1529 melody of "Lob Gott getrost mit Singen". The hymn is part of the current Protestant hymnal, and of other hymnals.

== History ==
The text of "Vertraut den neuen Wegen" was written in 1989 by Klaus-Peter Hertzsch, a Protestant professor of theology, as occasional poetry for the wedding of his god-daughter. The song in three stanzas was combined with the 1529 melody of "Lob Gott getrost mit Singen". Written during the last months before the fall of the Berlin Wall, the text captures a sense of a new beginning, based on trust in God who guided on difficult ways in the past. The song, written the night before the wedding and copied for the guests, was performed during the ceremony at the Annenkirche in Eisenach on 4 August 1989. The guests, including some from the West, took the song back home, and used it in their parishes.

After the Wende, it was repeated in a service concluding the Jenaer Friedensdekade (Jena decade of peace). The author also gave the song to his friend, Jürgen Henkys, for his 60th birthday. Henkys was a member of the commission for the then new Protestant hymnal Evangelisches Gesangbuch. Although the selection was already done, Henkys presented his gift, arguing that not enough songs focus on new ways, full of trust. The song was accepted, and appeared in 1993 as EG 395. It also appeared in regional sections of the Catholic Gotteslob and in the Gesangbuch der Evangelisch-methodistischen Kirche. It became one of the popular new hymns.
