= Freuet euch der schönen Erde =

German hymn

- Lutheran hymn
- Written: 1827
- Text: by Philipp Spitta
- Language: German
- Melody: by Frieda Fronmüller
- Composed: 1928

"Freuet euch der schönen Erde" (Enjoy the beautiful Earth) is a Lutheran hymn in German with a text by Philipp Spitta in 1827. In the hymnal Evangelisches Gesangbuch, it appears as EG 510, with a 1928 melody by Frieda Fronmüller.

== History ==
The text was written by Philipp Spitta, a Lutheran theologian from Lower Saxony, in 1827, when he worked as young private teacher in Lüne near Lüneburg. It describes the beauty of nature as God's creation, comparing it to precious artwork. He wrote five stanzas of four lines each, with the last line repeated.

The text first appeared without a melody in Spitta's song collection Psalter und Harfe (Psalter and harp), subtitled Sammlung christlicher Lieder zur häuslichen Erbauung (Collection of Christian songs for edification at home). The hymn was titled "Die Schönheit der Natur" (The beauty of nature). Several melodies were tried. In 1928, Frieda Fronmüller composed a new melody which was successful with choirs, and was chosen for inclusion in the modern German Protestant hymnal Evangelisches Gesangbuch as EG 510. The hymn also appears in many songbooks.

== Text ==
The text as in the Protestant hymnal is:

Freuet euch der schönen Erde,
denn sie ist wohl wert der Freud.
O was hat für Herrlichkeiten
unser Gott da ausgestreut!

Und doch ist sie seiner Füße
reich geschmückter Schemel nur,
ist nur eine schön begabte,
wunderreiche Kreatur.

Freuet euch an Mond und Sonne
und den Sternen allzumal,
wie sie wandeln, wie sie leuchten
über unserm Erdental.

Und doch sind sie nur Geschöpfe
von des höchsten Gottes Hand,
hingesät auf seines Thrones
weites, glänzendes Gewand.

Wenn am Schemel seiner Füße
und am Thron schon solcher Schein,
o was muss an seinem Herzen
erst für Glanz und Wonne sein.

Rejoice in the beautiful earth,
for well she deserveth our praise,
what tongue can declare all the worth,
which God to adorn her displays!

And yet, tho' so richly endowed,
she is only the work of his hands,
a creature, which well may be proud
to do whatsoe'er he commands.

Rejoice in the moon and the sun,
and the stars brightly shining by night,
as the course, God appoints them, they run,
and lend us their lustre and light.

And yet, while they shine on our globe,
they are only the work of his hand,
the spangles adorning his robe,
the creatures that wait his command.

If then but his handiwork here
such blessings already impart,
O what must our rapture be there,
to repose on his fatherly heart!

The song has been compared to Paul Gerhardt's "Geh aus, mein Herz, und suche Freud". Both appeared after wars, Spitta's after the Napoleonic Wars, and both reflect the beauty of nature as God's creation. Spitta's text looks at natural beauty in the first and third stanzas, and contrasts it to heavenly beauty described in the second and forth stanzas. The final stanza is a summary, imagining the even greater joy at God's heart ("an seinem Herzen").

== Usage ==
"Freuet euch der schönen Erde" has been used as a slogan for concerns of ecology and preservation of nature. It is the title of a 2000 book about Christian understanding of nature in history, a booklet for a children's event, and an exhibition about art related to nature, among others.
