= St. Michael, Fürth =

St. Michael
- Stadtpfarrkirche St. Michael
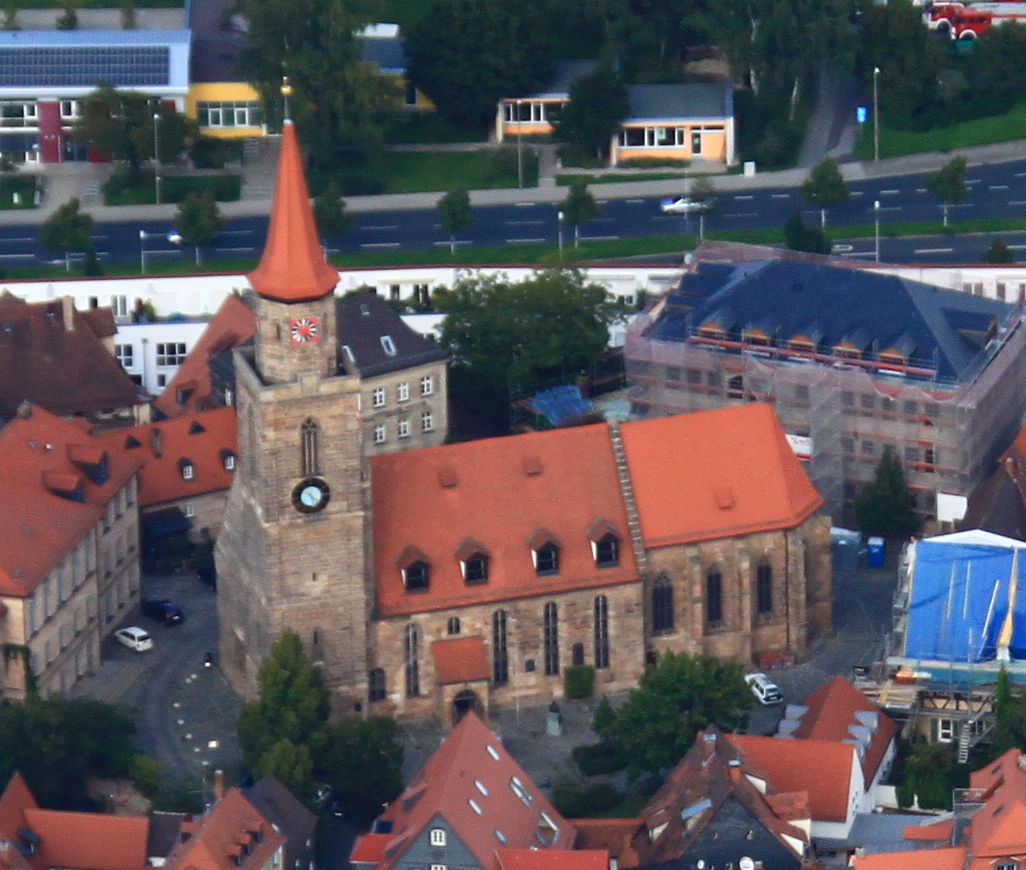
- St. Michael from the south
- St. Michael
- 49°28′48″N 10°59′19″E
- Location: Fürth, Bavaria, Germany
- Denomination: Lutheran
- Website: www.stmichael-fuerth.de

History
- Dedication: Michael the archangel

St. Michael is a Lutheran church and parish in Fürth, Bavaria, Germany, also called Stadtpfarrkirche St. Michael, indicating that it is the town's most prominent church. Building began in the 12th century. After Fürth became Protestant the building was remodelled in Baroque style, including balconies. An organ and stained-glass windows were installed in the 20th century.

== History ==
The present church was built in phases. The Langhaus was built c. 1100 as the oldest part, but was remodelled often. It is dedicated to Michael the archangel, who has been patron saint of Fürth from the 13th century. The tower was added in the 1380s or 1390s, with a portal dated between 1390 and 1410, due to comparison with art in Nürnberg. The tower was a place of refuge in times of war in a town that had no fortification. The choir was added around 1480. The octagonal top of the tower was built around 1530.

The church and parish became Protestant following the Reformation in Nürnberg on 5 June 1524. The date of the first Visitation on 3 September 1528 is usually accepted as the beginning of Reformation in Fürth. As the oldest church building, a Martinskapelle, was probably destroyed in the Thirty Years War, St. Michael was the only church in town until 1824. The church was for centuries the only monumental building in Fürth, and its tower dominated its skyline.

The interior was remodelled in Baroque style in the 17th century, and balconies in U-shape were installed to seat more people. The only feature from the Gothic period is a housing for the sacrament, created from sandstone by Adam Kraft around 1500. In the 19th century, the interior was converted to neo-Gothic style.

== Windows ==
Hanns Gottfried von Stockhausen, artist and later professor of glass design at the Stuttgart Kunstakademie, created stained-glass windows in the church that were installed between 1958 and 1969, showing Biblical figures and scenes, such as Michael the Archangel, the Crossing of the Red Sea, the Baptism of Jesus, and Christ as Judge.

== Church music ==
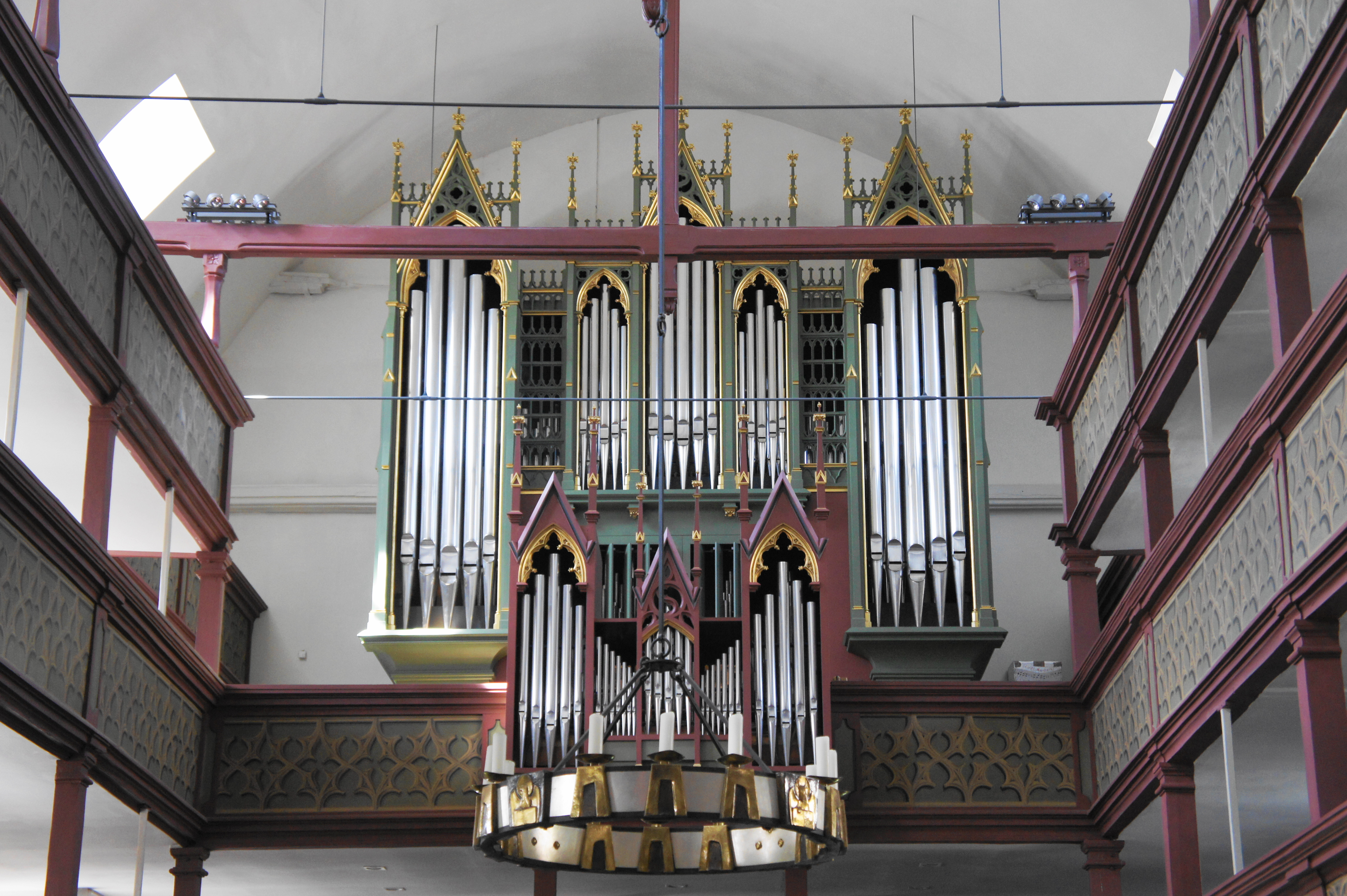
Interior with organ

The main organ was built in 1979 by Ekkehard Simon from Landshut. It included the Gothic-revival front from 1904. It features 45 stops on three manuals and pedal.

From 1923 to 1964, the composer Frieda Fronmüller was church musician at the church as the Kirchenmusikdirektorin.
