= Gustav Schickedanz =

German entrepreneur

Gustav Abraham Schickedanz
- Born: 1 January 1895; Fürth, German Empire
- Died: 27 March 1977 (aged 82); Fürth, West Germany
- Occupation: entrepreneur
- Spouse(s): second wife Grete Schickedanz, née Lachner (first wife Anna Schickedanz, née Zehnder)

Gustav Abraham Schickedanz (1 January 1895 – 27 March 1977) was a German entrepreneur and Nazi party member who profited from the Aryanization of Jewish companies.

== Early life ==
Schickedanz came from a modest background. After attending realschule in his hometown of Fürth, he completed a commercial apprenticeship.

In 1919 he married Anna Zehnder.

He registered his first enterprise in 1923 and in 1927 registered the mail order company Quelle, later Europe's largest mail-order house.

On July 15, 1929, his wife Anna and only son Leonhard were killed in an automobile accident in which he was also seriously injured. Only his daughter at the time, Louise, was unharmed.

== Career in Nazi era ==
When the Nazis came to power in 1933, Jews were forced out of businesses. In 1935 Schickedanz, a Nazi party member, was involved in the Aryanization (or forced transfer) of the property of the Jewish businessmen Oskar and Emil Rosenfelder, acquiring for a low price the rights to the Tempo brand and the paper company Vereinigte Papierwerke in Nuremberg.

In 1939 Quelle achieved sales of 40 million Reichsmark.

On 8 June 1942 Gustav Schickedanz married 17 years younger Grete Lachner in St.-Pauls-Kirche in Fürth. On 20 October 1943 daughter Madeleine was born in the bunker of Nuremberg women's hospital.

== Postwar ==
After the war Schickedanz was initially prohibited from carrying on his business by the American occupation authorities.

He was later rehabilitated and in 1952 was awarded a "citizen's medal" by the city of Fürth; in 1959 he was made an honorary citizen, the equivalent of being given the keys to the city. Efforts were made to rewrite his history under the Nazis.

After numerous acquisitions, Quelle's group sales reached 5 billion Deutschmarks by 1972.

Gustav Schickedanz and his wife Grete initiated a number of charitable works for which they received much public recognition.

== Other readings ==
- "Die Zeit" Nr. 24, 5. Juni 2003 Author: Georg Etscheit (in German)
- "Das kleine Buch vom Taschentuch" von Eugen Roth (in German)
- Artikel in CICERO "Die Weihnachtsfrau" von Thomas Schuler (in German)
