= O komm, du Geist der Wahrheit =

Lutheran hymn for Pentecost

- Lutheran hymn
- English: O come, you spirit of truth
- Occasion: Pentecost
- Written: 1827
- Text: Philipp Spitta
- Language: German
- Melody: "Lob Gott getrost mit Singen"
- Composed: 1529
- Published: 1833

"O komm, du Geist der Wahrheit" (literally: O come, you spirit of truth) is a Lutheran hymn for Pentecost in German. The text was written by Philipp Spitta, probably in 1827, and published in 1833 in the song collection Psalter und Harfe. It is a prayer to the Holy Spirit for courage to confession in a time poor in faith. The hymn which first appeared without a melody, is now usually sung to the 1529 melody of "Lob Gott getrost mit Singen". It is part of the current Protestant hymnal, and of other hymnals.

== History ==
Philipp Spitta, a Lutheran theologian from Lower Saxony, probably wrote the text of "O komm, du Geist der Wahrheit" in 1827, when he worked as young private teacher in Lüne near Lüneburg. He wrote his best songs during this time. "O komm, du Geist der Wahrheit" was published in his song collection Psalter und Harfe (Psalter and Harp), which was intended as its subtitle reads for private edification at home ("zur häuslichen Erbauung"), and in devotional meetings of a family, his songs became soon part of hymnals for church services.

The song is contained in the common Protestant hymnal, Evangelisches Gesangbuch, as EG 136, and other hymnals.

== Text and contents ==
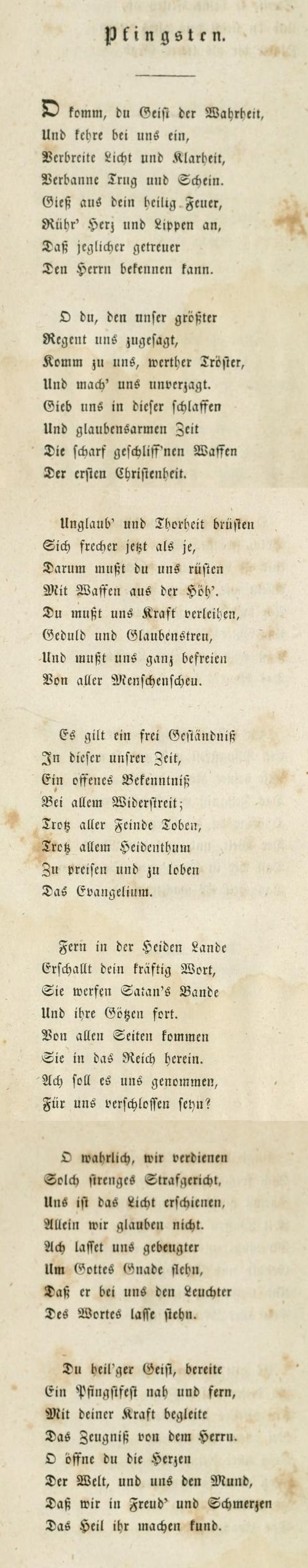
"O komm, du Geist der Wahrheit" in Psalter und Harfe, 1834

Spitta wrote seven stanzas of eight lines each. A handwritten sketch had ten stanzas, but he chose to publish only seven. The metre is common in Lutheran hymnody, including "O Haupt voll Blut und Wunden" and "Wie soll ich dich empfangen". It is a prayer to the Holy Spirit for courage to confession in a time poor in faith ("glaubensarme Zeit"). The text is quoted as in Evangelisches Gesangbuch, EG 136:

1. O komm, du Geist der Wahrheit,
und kehre bei uns ein,
verbreite Licht und Klarheit,
verbanne Trug und Schein.
Gieß aus dein heilig Feuer,
rühr Herz und Lippen an,
dass jeglicher getreuer
den Herrn bekennen kann.

2. O du, den unser größter
Regent uns zugesagt:
komm zu uns, werter Tröster,
und mach uns unverzagt.
Gib uns in dieser schlaffen
und glaubensarmen Zeit
die scharf geschliffnen Waffen
der ersten Christenheit.

3. Unglaub und Torheit brüsten
sich frecher jetzt als je;
darum musst du uns rüsten
mit Waffen aus der Höh.
Du musst uns Kraft verleihen,
Geduld und Glaubenstreu
und musst uns ganz befreien
von aller Menschenscheu.

4. Es gilt ein frei Geständnis
in dieser unsrer Zeit,
ein offenes Bekenntnis
bei allem Widerstreit,
trotz aller Feinde Toben,
trotz allem Heidentum
zu preisen und zu loben
das Evangelium.

5. In aller Heiden Lande
erschallt dein kräftig Wort,
sie werfen Satans Bande
und ihre Götzen fort;
von allen Seiten kommen
sie in das Reich herein;
ach soll es uns genommen,
für uns verschlossen sein?

6. O wahrlich, wir verdienen
solch strenges Strafgericht;
uns ist das Licht erschienen,
allein wir glauben nicht.
Ach lasset uns gebeugter
um Gottes Gnade flehn,
dass er bei uns den Leuchter
des Wortes lasse stehn.

7. Du Heilger Geist, bereite
ein Pfingstfest nah und fern;
mit deiner Kraft begleite
das Zeugnis von dem Herrn.
O öffne du die Herzen
der Welt und uns den Mund,
dass wir in Freud und Schmerzen
das Heil ihr machen kund.

The term "Geist der Wahrheit" (Spirit of Truth) is derived from a phrase by Jesus as narrated in the Farewell Discourse in the Gospel of John. The text further relies on the description of the early Christianity in Acts of the Apostles, and compares their attitude and confession to the poet's time in which he sees faith and confession weakened by rationalism and enlightenment.

== Melody ==
"O komm, du Geist der Wahrheit" has been combined with several melodies of the same metre: in Evangelisches Gesangbuch, it was printed as No. 199 with the melody of "Valet will ich dir geben", in Deutsches Gesangbuch, it was listed as No. 221 in a section "Reformation und Innere Mission" with the melody of "Herzlich tut mich verlangen", with a note that it can also be used for Pentecost, and in a hymnal Gesangbuch für Gemeinden des Evangelisch-Lutherischen Bekenntnisses, it was printed as No. 174 with the melody of "Wie soll ich dich empfangen", as a song for Missionsfest, a mission celebration. In modern hymnals, it appears with a melody that appeared first with an autumn song, in simpler rhythm, and was then associated with "Lob Gott getrost mit Singen". Its spirited melody, ending in an exuberant melisma, matches the urgent request for a life-giving Spirit well.
