= Klaus-Peter Hertzsch =

German Protestant theologian, poet, author and hymn write

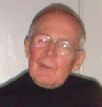
- Hertzsch in 2010
- Born: 23 September 1930 (age 95); Jena
- Died: 25 November 2015 (aged 85); Jena
- Education: University of Jena
- Occupations: Theologian; Hymn writer; Academic teacher
- Organizations: Hochschule für Musik und Darstellende Kunst Frankfurt am Main; inTAKT

Klaus-Peter Hertzsch (23 September 1930 – 25 November 2015) was a German Protestant theologian, poet, author and hymn writer.

== Life and career ==
Born in Jena the son of a Protestant theologian, Erich Hertzsch, Hertzsch grew up in Eisenach. He studied theology at the University of Jena. He was pastor in Jena from 1957 to 1959, then students' pastor there. From 1966 he was director of the central office of Protestant student parishes in East Berlin. He was professor of theology in Jena from 1968 until 1995.

He was known for poems, such as Biblische Balladen after stories from the Old Testament, set to music by Wolfgang Elger, and the text of the 1989 hymn "Vertraut den neuen Wegen", written first as occasional poetry for the wedding of his god-daughter. After the Wende, it was included in the Protestant hymnal Evangelisches Gesangbuch, regional sections of the Catholic Gotteslob and in the Gesangbuch der Evangelisch-methodistischen Kirche. It became one of the popular new hymns.

Hertzsch died on 25 November 2015 at age 85.

== Awards ==
- 2008: Erster Preisträger der neugestifteten Martin-Luther-Medaille des Rates der Evangelischen Kirche in Deutschland (EKD)
- 2011: Ehrenbürgerwürde der Stadt Jena

== Publications ==
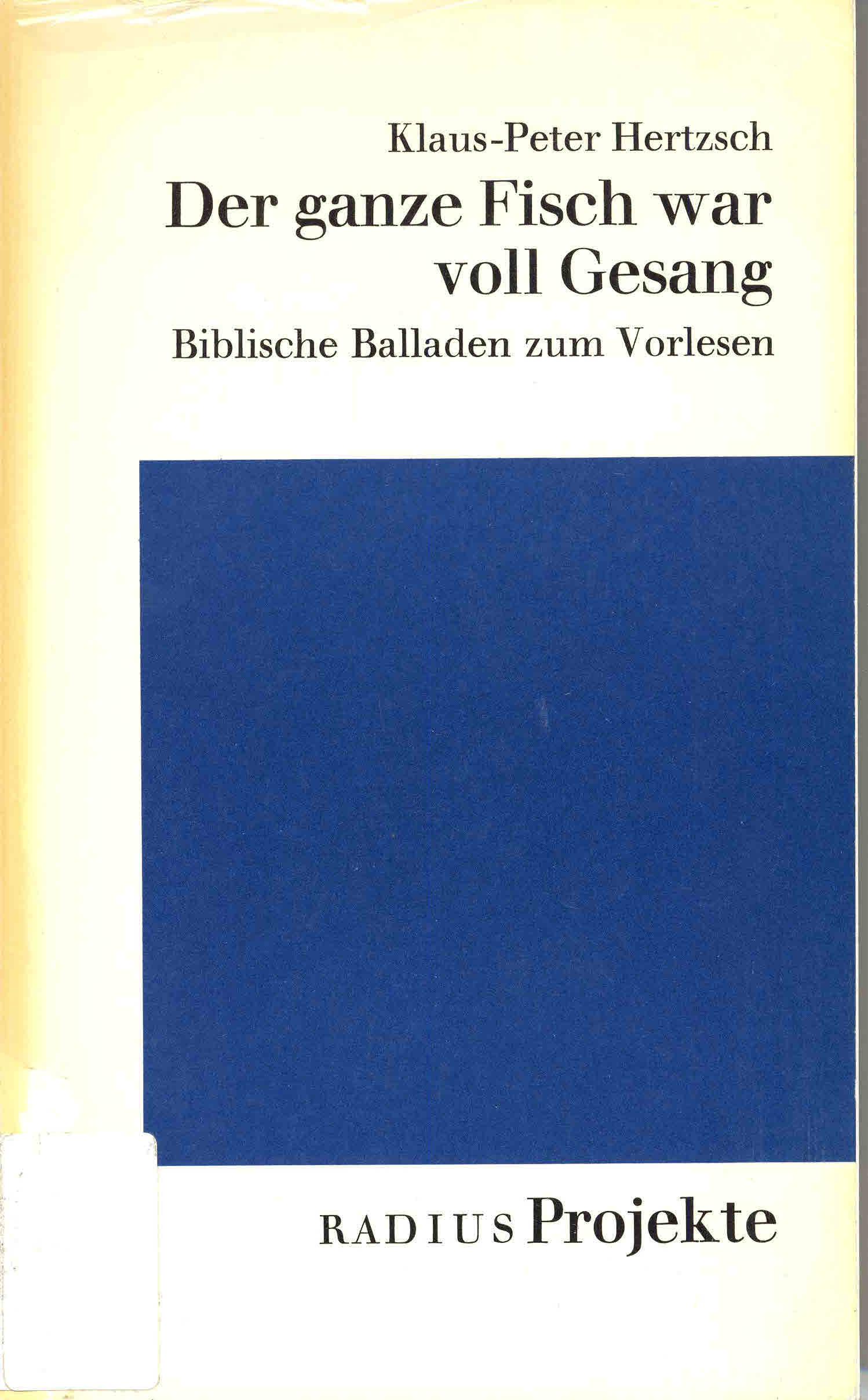
1970 book cover

- Wie schön war die Stadt Ninive. Biblische Balladen zum Vorlesen. Union, Berlin 1967 = Der ganze Fisch war voll Gesang. Biblische Balladen zum Vorlesen. Radius, Stuttgart 1969.
- Sprache des Friedens. Materialien des gemeinsamen Seminars von Bund der Evangelischen Kirchen in der DDR und der Christlichen Friedenskonferenz/International. Bad Saarow 1986
- Nachdenken über den Fisch. Texte und Predigten. Radius, Stuttgart 1994.
- Die Predigt im Gottesdienst. In: Hans-Christoph Schmidt-Lauber, Karl-Heinrich Bieritz (eds.): Handbuch der Liturgik. Liturgiewissenschaft in Theologie und Praxis der Kirche. Evangelische Verlagsanstalt, Leipzig 1995, S. 731 ff.
- Christliche Predigt über Texte aus dem Alten Testament. In: Berliner Theologische Zeitschrift. 1997.
- Alle Jahre neu. Weihnachtsmeditationen. Wartburg, Weimar 2000; 2005, ISBN 3-86160-165-6.
- Sag meinen Kindern, dass sie weiterziehn. Erinnerung. Radius, Stuttgart 2002, ISBN 3-87173-247-8.
- Wie mein Leben wieder hell werden kann. Eine Einladung zur Beichte in der evangelisch-lutherischen Kirche. Kirchenamt of the VELKD. Hannover 2002.
- Laß uns vorwärts in die Weite sehn. Texte zu meiner Biographie. Radius, Stuttgart 2004, ISBN 3-87173-298-2.
- Chancen des Alters. Sieben Thesen. Radius, Stuttgart 2008, ISBN 978-3-87173-109-9.
- Die Stärken des Schwachen. Erinnerungen an eine gefährliche Zeit. Radius, Stuttgart 2012.
