= Lasst uns Gott, dem Herrn, lobsingen =

Christian hymn in German

- Christian hymn
- Written: 1944
- Text: by Petronia Steiner
- Language: German
- Melody: by Johann Georg Ebeling
- Composed: 1666
- Published: 1975

"Lasst uns Gott, dem Herrn, lobsingen" (Let us sing praises to God, the Lord) is a Christian hymn written and sung in German with text by Petronia Steiner written in 1944 to a melody that Johann Georg Ebeling created in 1666 for a hymn by Paul Gerhardt. It is contained in regional sections of the Catholic hymnal Gotteslob.

== History ==
The author of the text was born Elisabeth Steiner in 1908 in Venningen, The Palatinate. She became a Dominican nun in 1928, adopting the name Petronia. From 1942, she worked for a new hymnal for the Diocese of Speyer. She became the director of a new school of higher education for girls in Speyer, then called Nikolaus-von-Weis-Schule, in 1953 and remained in the position until 1974. In 1976, she became Superior General (Generaloberin) of the "Institut St. Dominikus Speyer" institution.

She wrote "Lasst uns Gott, dem Herrn, lobsingen" in 1944, to a melody that Johann Georg Ebeling composed in 1666 for a hymn by Paul Gerhardt, "Warum sollt ich mich denn grämen". Steiner wrote two stanzas which follow the complex rhyme scheme of the model. The content is singing praises to the Trinity, mentioning God as the Lord, and Jesus as the Saviour. The first stanza appeared in regional sections of the first common German Catholic hymnal Gotteslob in 1975, in the diocese of Limburg as GL 849. It was retained in the second edition, in Limburg as GL 808. The song can be used as a song instead of the liturgical Gloria, and has been used for occasions such as weddings and Christmas. It is part of a 2020 songbook for young Christians by the Diocese of Freiburg, Neue Lieder für Gott und die Welt (New songs for God and the world).

The melody by Ebeling was written for Paul Gerhardt's song, which has been set to music often, including by Johann Sebastian Bach. Herbert Voß, the cathedral organist of Aachen, composed a four-part setting of Steiner's song.
