= Fürth =

Fürth Färdd (Mainfränkisch)
- City
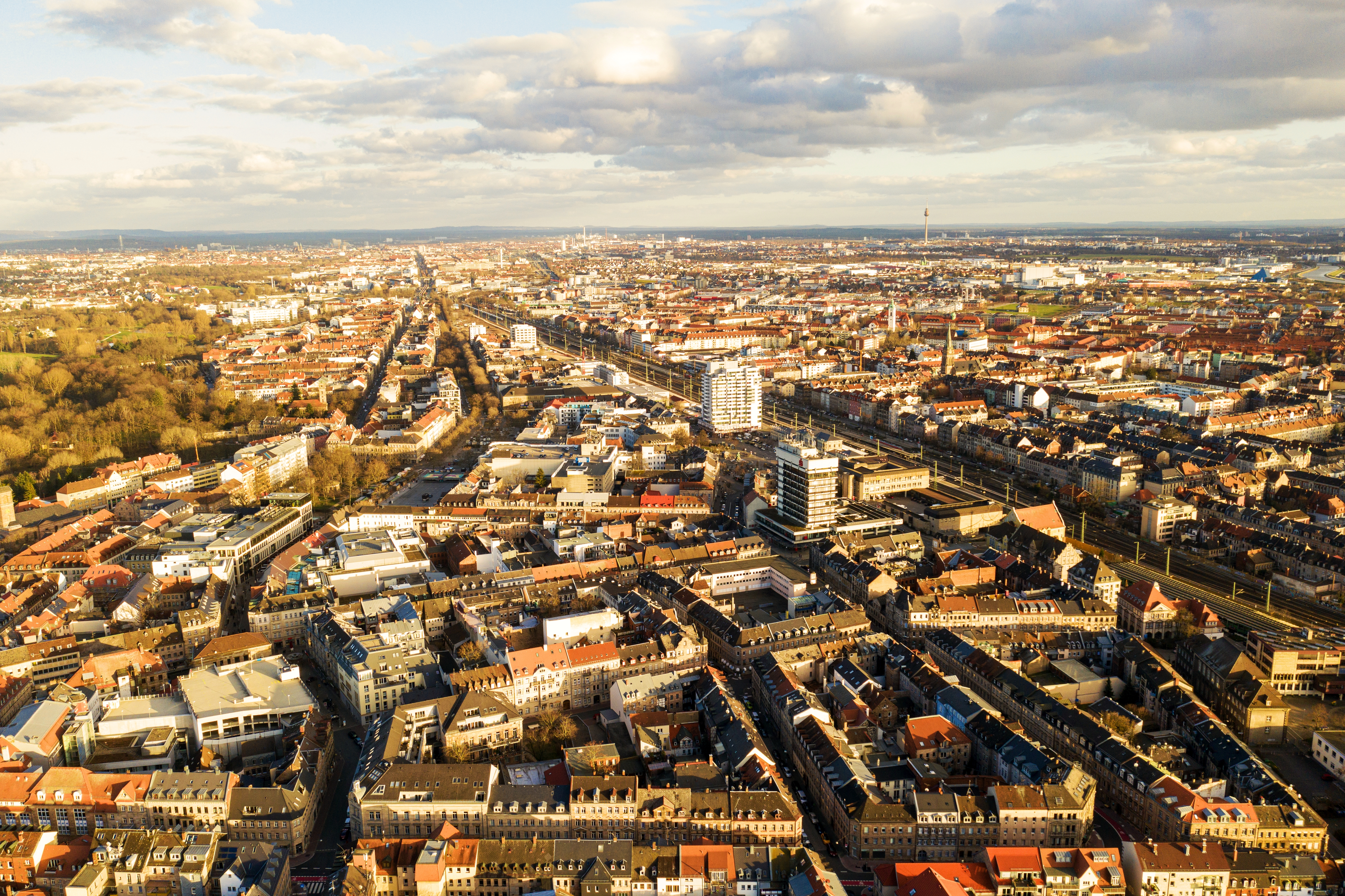
- View over the city center in direction to Nuremberg

- Flag Coat of arms
- Interactive map of Fürth
- Location within Germany Location within Bavaria
- Coordinates: 49°28′N 11°0′E
- Country: Germany
- State: Bavaria
- Admin. region: Middle Franconia
- District: Urban district

Government
  - Mayor (2026 - 2032): Thomas Jung (SPD)

Area
  - Total: 63.35 km^{2} (24.46 sq mi)
- Elevation: 294 m (965 ft)

Population (2025-12-31)
  - Total: 131,344
  - Density: 2,073/km^{2} (5,370/sq mi)
- Time zone: UTC+01:00 (CET)
  - Summer (DST): UTC+02:00 (CEST)
- Postal codes: 90701–90768
- Dialling codes: 0911
- Vehicle registration: FÜ
- Website: www.fuerth.de

Fürth (German: [fʏʁt]; East Franconian: Färdd) is a city in the Middle Franconia administrative region of Bavaria, Germany. It is the third-largest city in the larger Franconia region and is now contiguous with the larger city of Nuremberg, the centres of the two cities being only seven km (4.3 mi) apart.

The city forms a continuous conurbation with the neighbouring cities of Nuremberg, Erlangen and Schwabach, which is the heart of an urban area region with around 1.4 million inhabitants, while the larger Nuremberg Metropolitan Region has a population of approximately 3.6 million.

Fürth celebrated its thousand-year anniversary in 2007, its first mention being on 1 November 1007.

== Geography ==
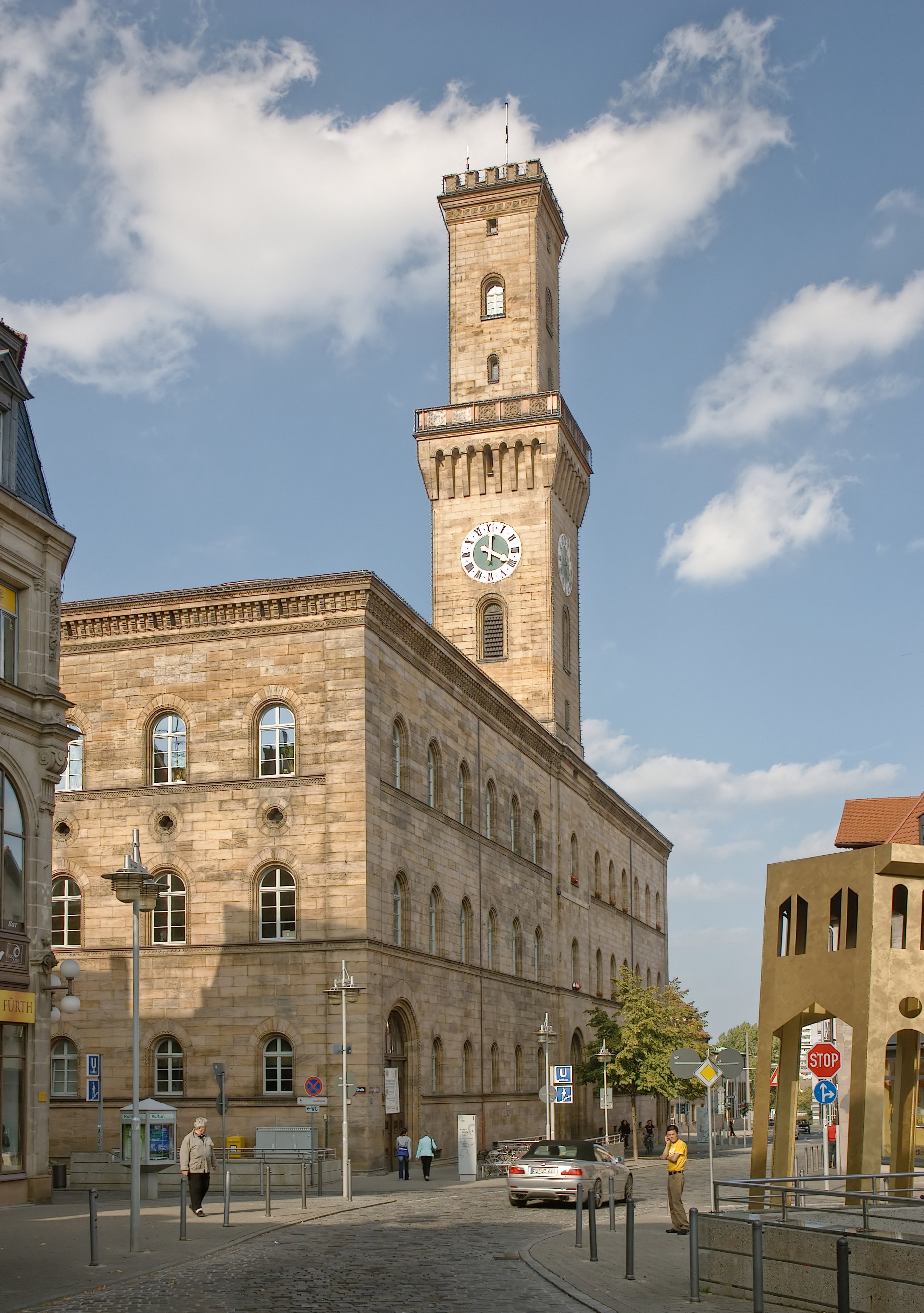
City Hall, seen from Hirschenstraße

The historic centre of the town is to the east and south of the rivers Rednitz and Pegnitz, which join to form the Regnitz to the northwest of the Old Town. To the west of the town, on the far side of the Main-Danube Canal, is the Fürth municipal forest (Fürther Stadtwald). To the east of Fürth, at roughly the same latitude, lies Nuremberg, and to the north is the fertile market-gardening area known as the Knoblauchsland (garlic country), some of which is within the borders of the urban district of Fürth. To the south of the town is an area consisting of wide roads, the canal, and meadows.

=== Neighbouring municipalities ===
The following towns and municipalities share borders with Fürth; they are listed in clockwise order, starting in the north:

Erlangen and Nuremberg, which are independent urban districts; Stein, Oberasbach, Zirndorf, Cadolzburg, Seukendorf, Veitsbronn, and Obermichelbach, which are municipalities within the rural district (Landkreis) of Fürth.

=== Parts of town ===
Beyond the town proper, the urban district comprises another 20 localities:

- Atzenhof
- Bislohe
- Braunsbach
- Burgfarrnbach
- Dambach
- Flexdorf
- Herboldshof
- Kronach
- Mannhof
- Oberfürberg
- Poppenreuth
- Ritzmannshof
- Ronhof
- Sack
- Stadeln
- Steinach
- Unterfarrnbach
- Unterfürberg
- Vach
- Weikershof

== History ==
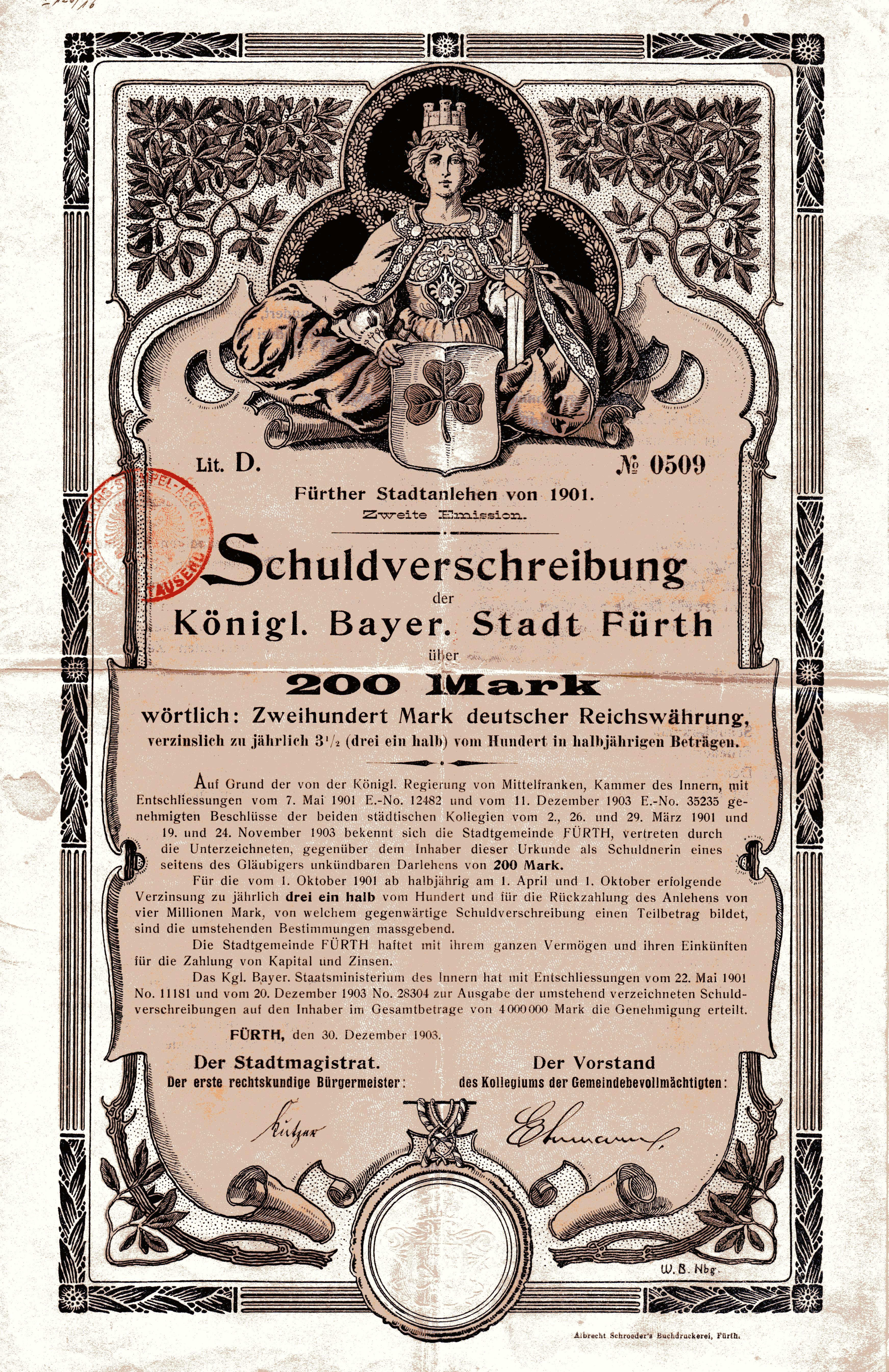
Bond of the City of Fürth, issued 30 December 1903

Founded as a Franconian settlement in the mid-8th century AD, the first historical mention of Fürth was in a document dated 1 November 1007, in which the Emperor Heinrich II donated his property in Fürth to the newly created Bishopric of Bamberg. The name "Fürth" derives from the German word for "ford", as the first settlements originated around a ford. In the following years, Fürth was granted market privileges, but these were later lost to the neighbouring Nuremberg, under Heinrich III. From 1062 onward, Fürth was again permitted to have a market, but by that time Nuremberg was already the more important town.

In the following centuries, the town was under varying authority, involving the Bishopric of Bamberg, the Principality of Ansbach and the City of Nuremberg. For a long time, the character of the settlement remained largely agricultural, and in 1600 the population was probably still only between 1000 and 2000.

In the Thirty Years War, the village was almost completely destroyed by fire, in military actions leading up to the September 1632 Battle of Fürth.

In 1835, the first German railway was opened between Nuremberg and Fürth.

Throughout the Cold War, Fürth had a significant NATO presence, especially the U.S. Army, due to its proximity to both the East German and Czechoslovak borders.

=== Expansion ===
In the course of time, a number of municipalities or other administrative divisions were integrated into the urban district of Fürth:

- 1 January 1899: the western part of the municipality of Höfen, including Weikershof (to the south of the Schwabacher Straße)
- 1 January 1900: the municipality of Poppenreuth (to the east of the historic centre of the city, on the far side of the river Pegnitz)
- 1 January 1901: the municipality of Dambach (to the west of the current Südstadt (South Town), as well as Unterfürberg and Oberfürberg
- 1 January 1918: Atzenhof (to the north-west, on the right bank of the River Zenn between Unterfarrnbach and Vach)
- 1 January 1918: the municipality of Unterfarrnbach (to the west, on the bank of the river Farrnbach)
- 3 December 1923: the municipality of Burgfarrnbach (to the north-west, on the far side of the canal, not contiguous with Fürth proper)
- 1 July 1927: the municipality of Ronhof, and Kronach
- 1 July 1972: the municipality of Sack, including Bislohe, which is north of the Knoblauchsland and is not separately listed in official documents.
- 1 July 1972: the municipality of Stadeln
- 1 July 1972: the municipality of Vach (to the north of Fürth, north of the river Zenn and west of river Regnitz
- 1 July 1972: Herboldshof and Steinach, previously parts of the municipality of Boxdorf

=== Population development ===
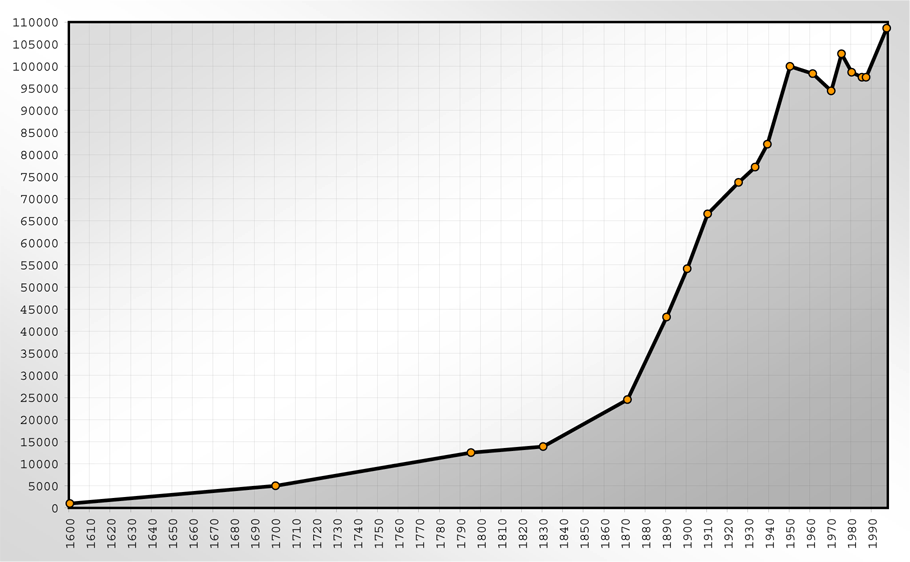
Population trend

In the Middle Ages and early Renaissance, the population of Fürth grew slowly, owing to the numerous wars, epidemics and famines. In the Thirty Years War, the town lost about half its population. When Croatian soldiers set fire to Fürth in 1634, it burned for several days, and was almost completely destroyed. At the end of the war, the population was a mere 800. In 1685, Reformed Christians from France, or Huguenots, settled in Fürth. By 1700 the restoration of the town had been completed, and the population rose to about 6000.

With the beginning of industrialization in the 19th century, the population began to increase rapidly. In 1800 Fürth had a population of 12,000; by 1895 it had multiplied fourfold to 47,000. In 1950 the population of the town exceeded 100,000, making it a Großstadt. At the end of 2005, as recorded by the Bavarian Statistical Office (Landesamt für Statistik und Datenverarbeitung), the population (based on principal residence) was 113,076, a historical record. This makes Fürth the second largest town in Middle Franconia, after Nuremberg, and the seventh largest town in Bavaria. As of 2015, the proportion of foreign nationals in Fürth is about 18 percent.

The following table shows the population of Fürth over time. Up to 1818 the figures are mainly estimates; after that they are mostly based on census results (¹) or official projections from the appropriate statistical offices or the town administration itself.

Year	Population
1604	1,600
1648	800
1700	6,000
1795	12,000
1809	12,438
1818	12,700
1 July 1830 ¹	13,900
1 December 1840 ¹	15,100
3 December 1852 ¹	16,700
3 December 1855 ¹	17,341
3 December 1858 ¹	18,241
3 December 1861 ¹	19,100
3 December 1864 ¹	21,100
3 December 1867 ¹	22,500
1 December 1871 ¹	24,580

Year	Population
1 December 1875 ¹	27,360
1 December 1880 ¹	31,063
1 December 1885 ¹	35,455
1 December 1890 ¹	43,206
2 December 1895 ¹	46,726
1 December 1900 ¹	54,144
1 December 1905 ¹	60,635
1 December 1910 ¹	66,553
1 December 1916 ¹	56,967
5 December 1917 ¹	57,282
8 October 1919 ¹	68,162
16 June 1925 ¹	73,693
16 June 1933 ¹	77,135
17 May 1939 ¹	82,315
31 December 1945	86,515

Year	Population
29 October 1946 ¹	95,369
13 September 1950 ¹	99,890
25 September 1956 ¹	98,643
6 June 1961 ¹	98,332
31 December 1965	96,125
27 May 1970 ¹	94,774
31 December 1975	101,639
31 December 1980	99,088
31 December 1985	97,331
25 May 1987 ¹	97,480
31 December 1990	103,362
31 December 1995	108,418
31 December 2000	110,477
30 December 2005	113,459
31 December 2010	114,628
31 December 2015	126,405

¹ Census result

Rank	Nationality	Population (31.12.2019)
1	Turkey	4,261
2	Romania	3,628
3	Greece	3,042
4	Bulgaria	1,930
5	Italy	1,448
6	Poland	1,250
7	Syria	1,014
8	Croatia	807

== Religions ==
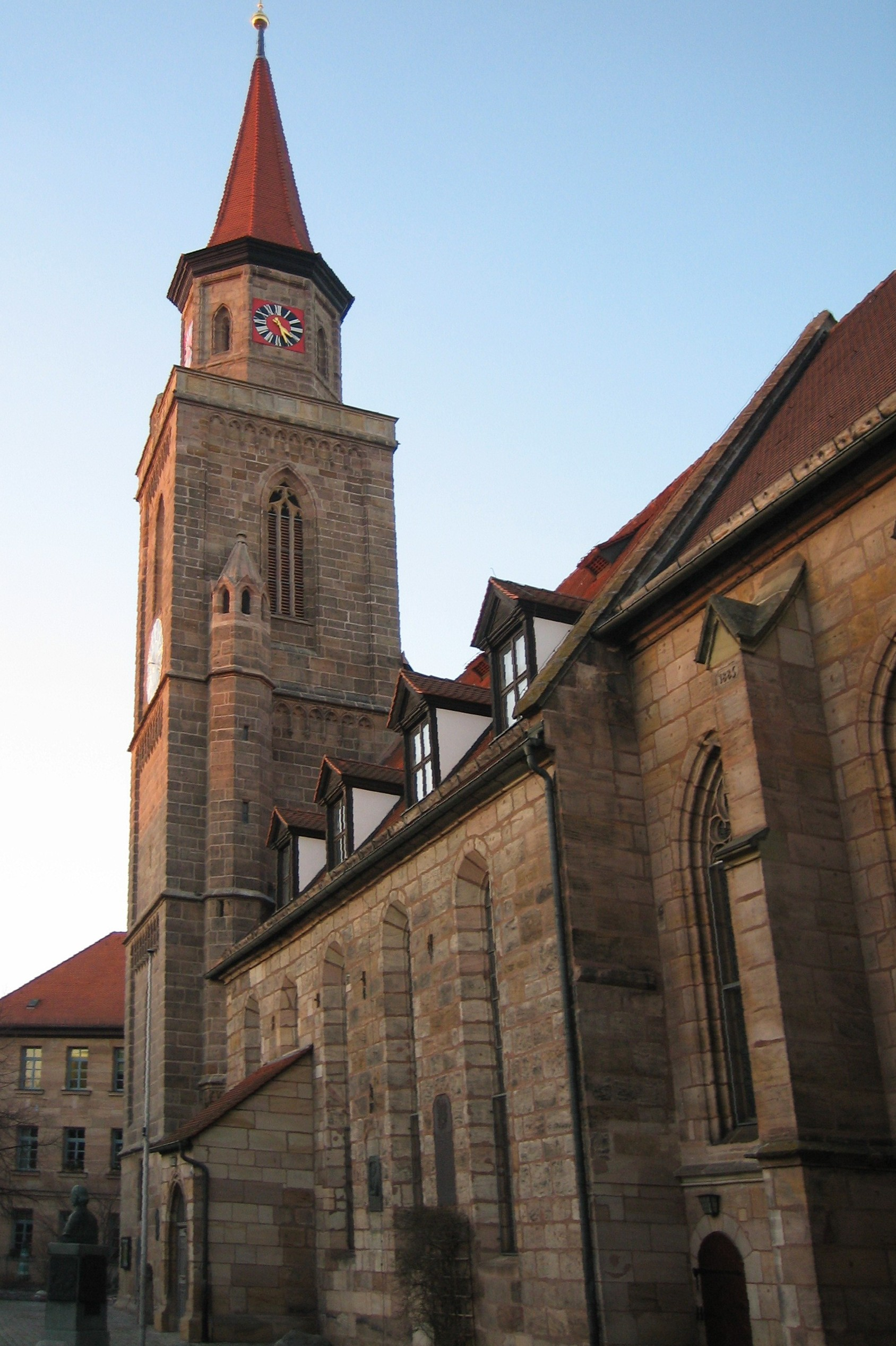
St. Michael, with West Tower

=== Christianity ===
The population of Fürth was originally under the Bishopric of Würzburg and from 1007 it belonged to the Bishopric of Bamberg. In 1524, as part of the Reformation, it became a Protestant town like Nuremberg, and it remained so for many years. However, because of the connections with Bamberg, there were always some Catholics in the town.

After 1792, the Protestant congregations in Fürth were under the authority of the Prussian Ansbach Consistory, and when Brandenburg-Ansbach was ceded to Bavaria they became part of the Bavarian Protestant Church, which initially comprised Lutheran and Reformed congregations. The congregations later belonged to the Deanery of Zirndorf. In 1885, Fürth became a deanery (Dekanat), subsidiary to Nuremberg.

Beside the Bavarian Protestant Church there are also Protestant congregations of free churches in Fürth, e. g. a small congregation of the United Methodist Church.

From the 18th century or earlier, the number of Catholics rose, and in 1829 the first Catholic church since the Reformation was consecrated: the Church of Our Lady. St. Michael was originally a Catholic church until taken by the Protestants during the Reformation. In 1961, Fürth became a Catholic Deanery within the Archdiocese.

The proportion of Protestants to Catholics in the 20th century was about two to one.

=== Judaism ===
The position enjoyed by Jews in Fürth (compared with other towns) led to the sobriquet "Franconian Jerusalem", though this is based on an older, pejoratively intended reference to Fürth.

Jewish residents are mentioned as early as 1440; in 1528 the Margrave of Ansbach, George the Pious, permitted two Jews, Perman and Uriel, to settle in Fürth (in return for high taxes), and from then on the number of Jewish residents increased.

By the 17th century, there was a local Yeshiva (Talmudic academy, Fürth Yeshiva) of considerable repute, and in 1617, a synagogue was built. In 1653, the first Jewish hospital in Germany (and Fürth's first hospital) was built.

When Emperor Leopold I deported the Viennese Jews in 1670, many upper-class Jewish families moved to Fürth, and by 1716 there were about 400 Jewish families in the town. In 1807, the proportion of Jews in the overall population was about 19%. Following the Mediatization and the Bavarian Judenedikt (Jewish Edict) of 1813, there were more restrictions on Jews. In particular, the Matrikelparagraph provisions prevented Jewish immigration. In 1824, the Talmudic academy was closed. The Bavarian Judenedikt of 1813, with its restrictions on Jewish life and Jewish immigration was rescinded by the law of 29 June 1851, and further laws dated 16 April 1868, and 22 April 1871, which led to further emancipation of the Jews, and restrictions on residence were removed. By 1840, there were 2,535 Jews living in Fürth, more than half of all Bavarian Jews.

In 1862, a Jewish primary school was founded, followed by a secondary school in 1882. The highest number of Jewish residents was reached in 1880, at about 3,300.

In 1933, there were 1,990 Jews in Fürth. By early 1938 after the rise of the Nazis, there were 1,400 Jews in Fürth. In November 1938, there were about 1,200 when the synagogue was destroyed in the Kristallnacht pogroms, and 132 Jews were deported to Dachau. All except a handful of those who remained in Fürth after Kristallnacht either fled while they still could (abroad or to other areas in Germany) or were deported to concentration camps and/or death camps; virtually all those who remained in Germany were deported to their deaths. By 1944, perhaps 23 Jews were left in Fürth. Overall, 1,068 Jews from Fürth were murdered in the Holocaust.

After the end of the Second World War, a Displaced persons camp for Jewish Holocaust survivors was established in Fürth (Finkenschlag). In 1945 it housed 850 inhabitants; it was shut down in July 1950.

There is a memorial to the Jewish community in the Geleitsgasse square, just off Königstrasse. Archaeologists discovered a Mikvah (ritual bath) in a house in the centre of Fürth. This building now houses the Jewish Museum of Franconia, which opened in 1998.

The old Jewish cemetery (Weiherstraße), which was established in 1607, is one of the oldest in Germany. It suffered considerable destruction and desecration during the Nazi regime and the Second World War, but was restored in 1949 and is now one of the best-preserved Jewish cemeteries in Germany. A new Jewish cemetery was consecrated in 1880, which has been in use from 1906 to the present day.

== Nature ==
The "Nature Trail for Urban Ecology" was established in 1999 (3 km (1.9 mi), 10 stops) and expanded in 2003 to include a second route (7 km (4.3 mi), 10 stops). Both tours begin at the Stadthalle underground railway station. Along the nature trail, different habitats and their importance for the flora and fauna of the area are explained (e.g. the churchyard of St. Michael's Church, the municipal cemetery, Scherbsgraben stream). The trail references the designation of some areas as protected areas, and explains problems of measures that affect the environment, such as river regulation.

Average sunshine duration is 1766 hours per year.

The Gustav-Adolf natural spring, near Weikershof, by the River Rednitz was restored in 2000 and a pavilion was erected. Until the 1980s, the spring water, which comes out of the ground at 19 °C (66 °F), was used for a swimming pool.

== Politics ==
=== Coat of arms ===
The Fürth coat of arms depicts a green trefoil (three-leaved clover) on a white (argent) background. The town colours are green and white. The trefoil first appeared on a seal of the governor of the city for the Bamberg Diocese, which depicted a trefoil held by a hand and between two crescents. Its origin is unclear, but the trefoil probably represents the three powers responsible for Fürth during the Middle Ages as well as being a symbol of the Trinity. From 1792 onward, there were three trefoils on a triple hill. In 1818, the town acquired a new coat of arms depicting a green trefoil surrounded by an oak branch (acorned). This coat of arms was retained for over 100 years. However, in 1939, the oak branch was removed. At that time, a new flag was introduced; it had two green stripes on a green background and the coat of arms on a green background on the upper part. Later, however, the flag was simplified to the colours white above) and green (below).

=== Administration ===
Until the end of the 18th century, the administration of Fürth was in the hands of a representative of the Diocese of Bamberg. Fürth was transferred to Bavaria in 1806; in 1808 it was made a "class II" city and was under the direct authority of the state. From 1818 Fürth became a "class I" city; this meant that it was responsible for its own administration.

Since 2002 Thomas Jung, (SPD), has been the First Mayor.

== Twin towns – sister cities ==
Fürth is twinned with:

- Limoges, France (1992)
- Marmaris, Turkey (1995)
- Paisley, Scotland, United Kingdom (1969)
- Xylokastro, Greece (2006)

== Economy and infrastructure ==
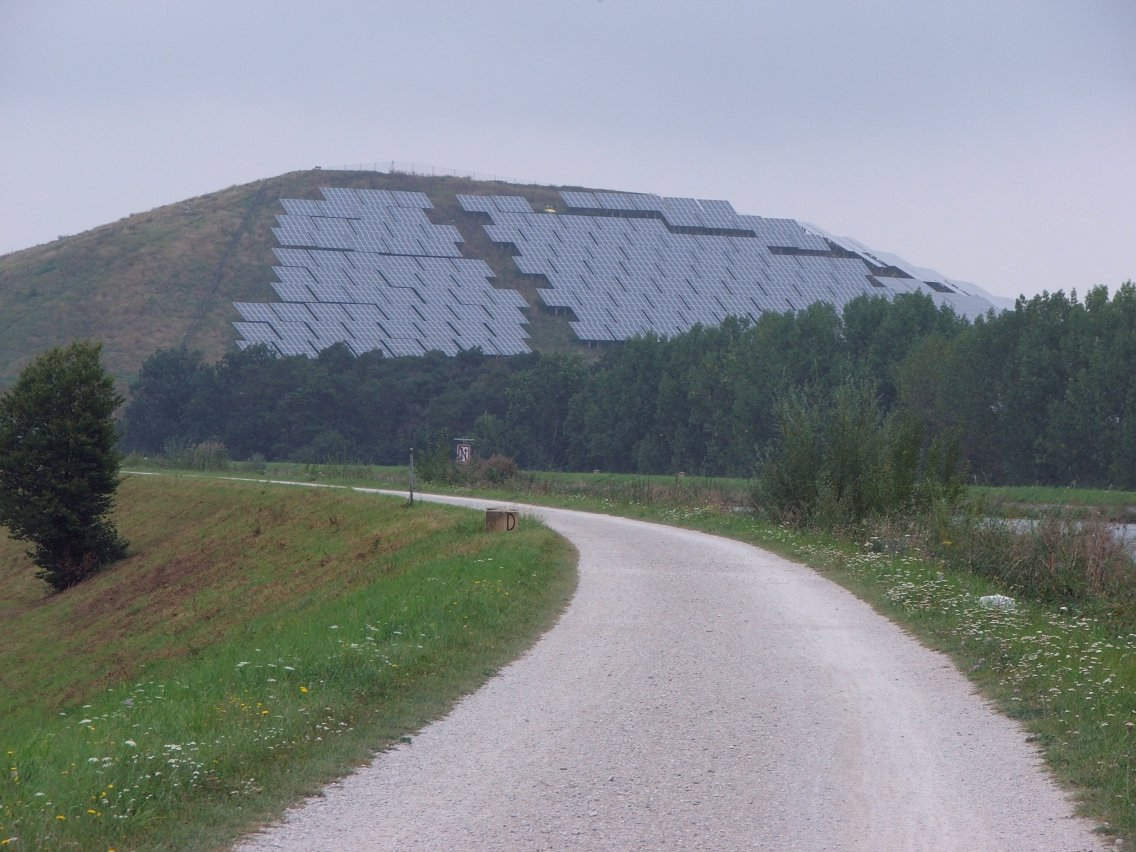
Solar power collection on former landfill at Atzenhof

As of July 2019, unemployment in Fürth was 2.9 percent.

The toy industry is a major employer in the Fürth economy, with a variety of toy-makers ranging from small crafts to large industrial enterprises.

Brewing was once important in Fürth. The five large breweries were Humbser, Geismann, Grüner, Evora & Meyer, and Berg Bräu. Around the turn of the 19th century, Fürth was more important than Munich as a "beer town".

Quelle, once the largest mail-order company in Europe, was based in Fürth before its insolvency and liquidation in 2009.

Fürth is also a centre of solar technology. An average of two megawatt of electricity are fed into the grid on sunny days by Infra Fürth, the local energy utility, using photovoltaic technology. A ground-based plant in Atzenhof located on a former landfill produces 1 MW, the largest individual share.

A new pumping station was built in 2003 near the confluence of the Pegnitz and Rednitz rivers. It provides artificial irrigation to the Knoblauchsland market garden area to the north-east of the city.

=== Transport ===
==== Airports ====
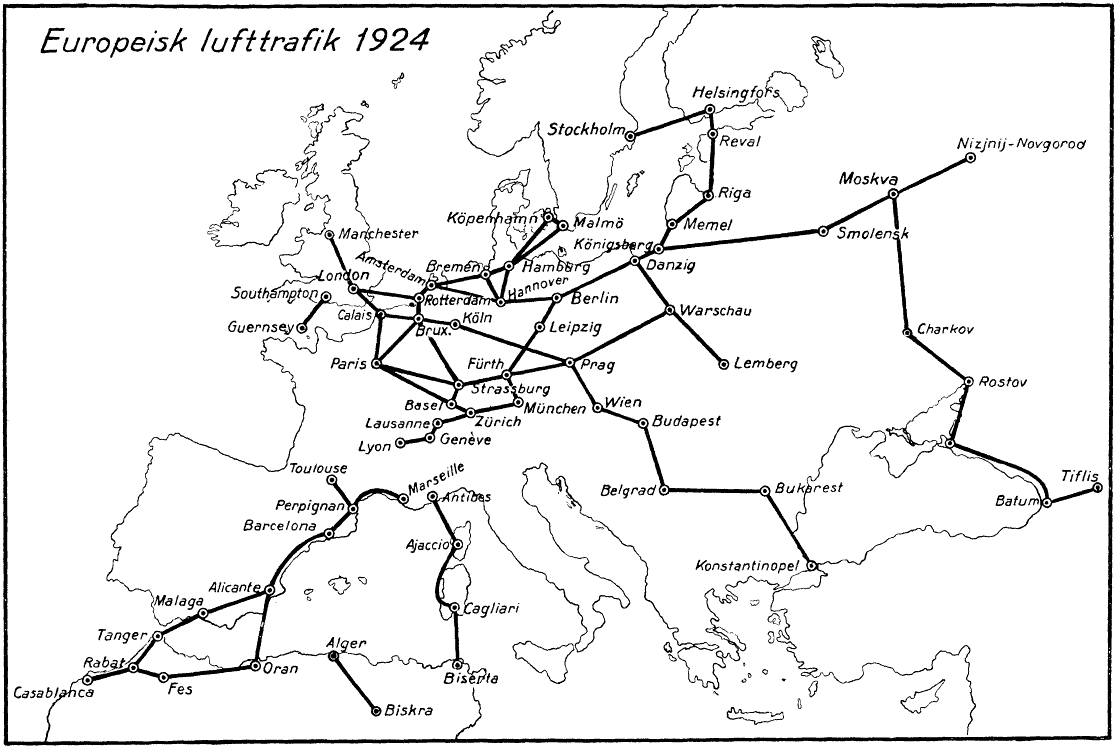
Map of European air traffic 1924 from the Nordisk familjebok encyclopedia

In 1914, an aerodrome was built at Atzenhof for the Third Bavarian Army Corps, which was extended in the following years. After the First World War, it became "Fürth–Nuremberg" international airport, which saved it from being completely dismantled. Fürth-Nuremberg Airport was the eighth largest of the 88 German airports. The importance of the airport increased further when Junkers transferred first its central repair workshop, and then the final assembly line for its aircraft from Dessau to Fürth. Under the Nazis, the airport at Atzenhof was expanded and used as a flying school. After Fürth was occupied by Allied troops, the US Army used the site as a barracks, until 1993 (Monteith Barracks Army Heliport). The US Army built the "Monteith Barracks" golf course on the site and maintained the historic buildings. In 1928, the city of Nuremberg took over the main share of the airport's operations. Until civil aviation operations ended in 1933, the airport was called "Flughafen Nuremberg-Fürth".

There was a second airport built at Fürth-Hardhöhe by the Gothaer Waggonfabrik, later called Industrieflughafen. It existed from 1919 until 6 April 1955.

==== Rail ====
The first railway line with steam trains in Germany was between Fürth and Nuremberg, and opened on December 7, 1835. The locomotive, named Adler (Eagle) was built in Newcastle by Stephenson, the builder of the famous Rocket. Fürth main station is served by multiple S-Bahn Lines, Regionalbahn and Regional-Express services and several Intercity and InterCity Express services. There is also a number of S-Bahn stations across the city. Nuremberg and Fürth are joined by an underground railway (subway) connection. In Fürth there are currently seven underground stations: Stadtgrenze (partly in Fürth), Jakobinenstraße, Fürth Hauptbahnhof, Rathaus, Stadthalle, Klinikum, and Hardhöhe.

See also: Nuremberg U-Bahn, Nuremberg S-Bahn

==== Water transport ====
A canal between Bamberg and Nuremberg started operation in 1843. There was a port at Poppenreuth. A new canal with a port in Fürth, the Rhine-Main-Danube Canal, was completed in 1992, creating a navigable connection from the Rhine delta in Rotterdam to the Danube Delta on the Black Sea.

==== Local public transport ====
Public transport in Fürth is managed by Infra Fürth.

=== Media ===
The Fürther Nachrichten is published daily. It was first published in 1946 as a local page in Nürnberger Nachrichten; today it is a separate newspaper but is in fact the same newspaper as Nürnberger Nachrichten with some additional sections for the town and the rural district of Fürth, respectively.

=== Companies in Fürth ===
The mail-order business Quelle, now merged with Karstadt to form KarstadtQuelle, was founded by Gustav Schickedanz on 26 October 1927. KarstadtQuelle Versicherungen, an insurance arm, was created in 1984.

Grundig had its headquarters and a number of manufacturing plants in Fürth, from the time the company was founded until the middle of 2000. The former headquarters on Kurgartenstraße was converted into a technology park ("Uferstadt Fürth"), and it now accommodates Technikum Neue Materialien (research center into new materials), an institute of the Fraunhofer-Gesellschaft, Sellbytel (a call centre operation), Computec Media AG, and the Radio Museum.

Siemens, based in Munich has several locations in Fürth.

Uvex headquarters and a manufacturing unit are in Fürth.

The toy manufacturers Simba Dickie Group (Simba, Dickie, BIG) and Bruder are based in Fürth.

=== Education ===
In Fürth, there are a total of 22 elementary schools. There are also 3 high schools (university-entrance level school) (gymnasia), in order of foundation: Hardenberg-Gymnasium (1833), Heinrich-Schliemann-Gymnasium (1896), and Helene-Lange-Gymnasium (1907). There are two "commercial" schools (Wirtschaftsschule/Realschule): the Hans Böckler School and the Leopold Ullstein School; there are also a number of vocational schools.

The siting of Erlangen-Nuremberg University's Central Institute for New Materials and Process Technology in Fürth in 2004 makes Fürth a university town. Some practical training elements of the Erlangen university medical school are at Fürth municipal hospital. Wilhelm Löhe Hochschule für angewandte Wissenschaften is a private University of Applied Sciences for health care and welfare.

=== Municipal amenities ===
At Scherbsgraben, there was an indoor and an outdoor swimming pool, a diving pool with a 10-metre tower, a large pool for non-swimmers, and a sauna. These facilities were completely renovated in 2006–2007. The open-air pool was re-opened in June 2006 and a new thermal spa (called Fürthermare) was opened in 2007. The complex is no longer run by the municipal authorities but is completely privatized and called Bäderland Fürth.

Fürth has a municipal library, with a number of branches; since 2003 it has been possible to access the catalogue via the Internet. There is a town archive in Burgfarrnbach.

== Amenities ==
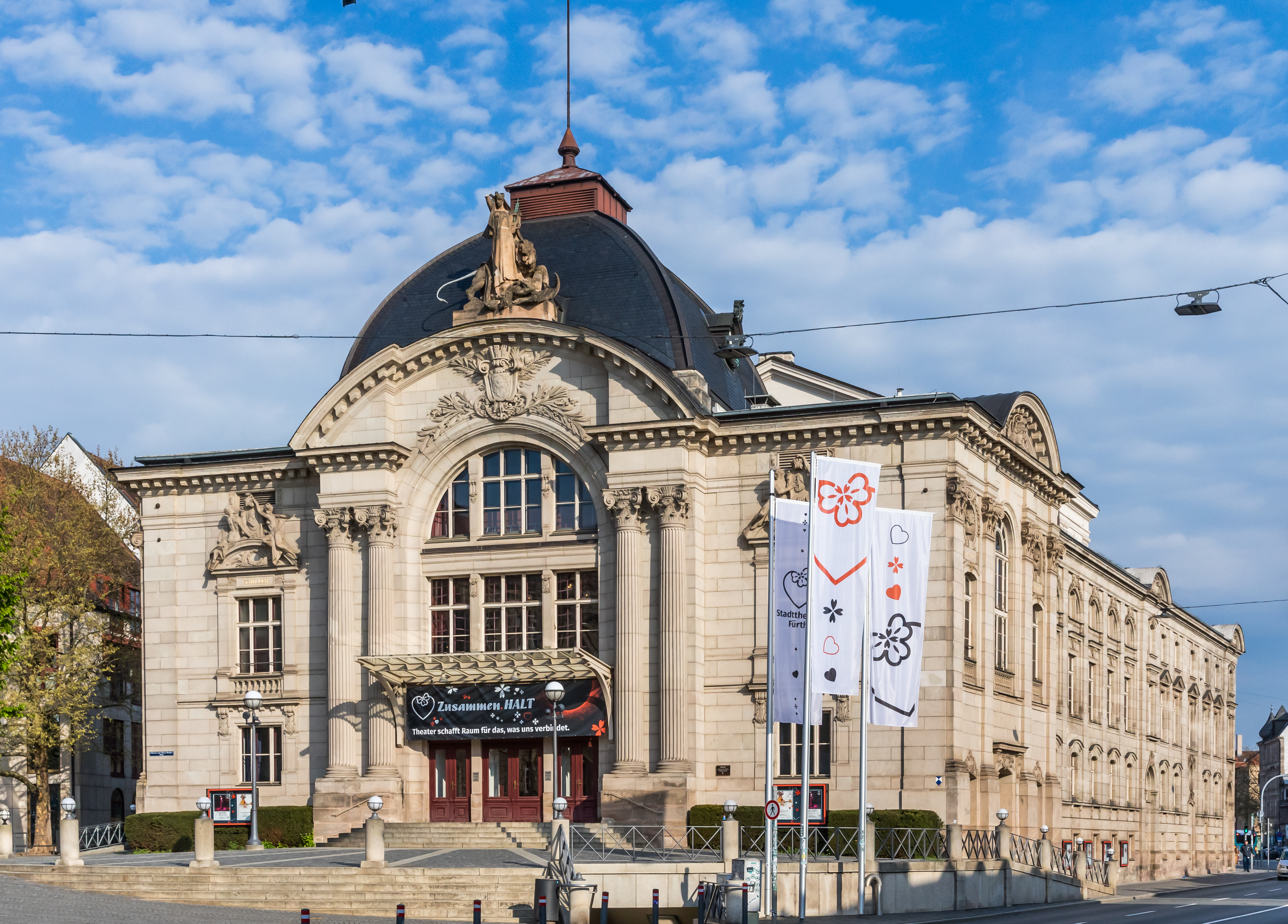
Stadttheater Fürth

=== Theatre ===
The municipal theatre (Stadttheater Fürth) was built by the Viennese theatre architects Fellner & Helmer in the Italian Renaissance and Baroque styles. It is very similar to the municipal theatre of the Ukrainian town of Chernivtsi, which was designed by the same architects.

Another playhouse, the Comödie Fürth, is now housed in the Jugendstil building known as the Berolzheimerianum. Regular appearances are made by the Franconian cult comedians Volker Heißmann and Martin Rassau, better known by their alter egos Waltraud and Mariechen. The playhouse hosts other appearances by German stars of comedy theatre.

=== Commercial areas ===
Fürth's main district for eating out and drinking is around the Gustavstraße, which is in the Old Town, near the Rathaus. There are many small pubs, cafés and cocktail bars, as well as restaurants serving Franconian cuisine. Esp. in suburbs und Stadtwald are some traditional franconian restaurants with beer garden / open air area.

Shopping facilities in Fürth include the mall Neue Mitte as well as many retail shops and an open market. A second mall, Flair is currently being built on the location of the previous City Center shopping center, and scheduled to open in April 2021.

== Sights ==
=== Monuments ===
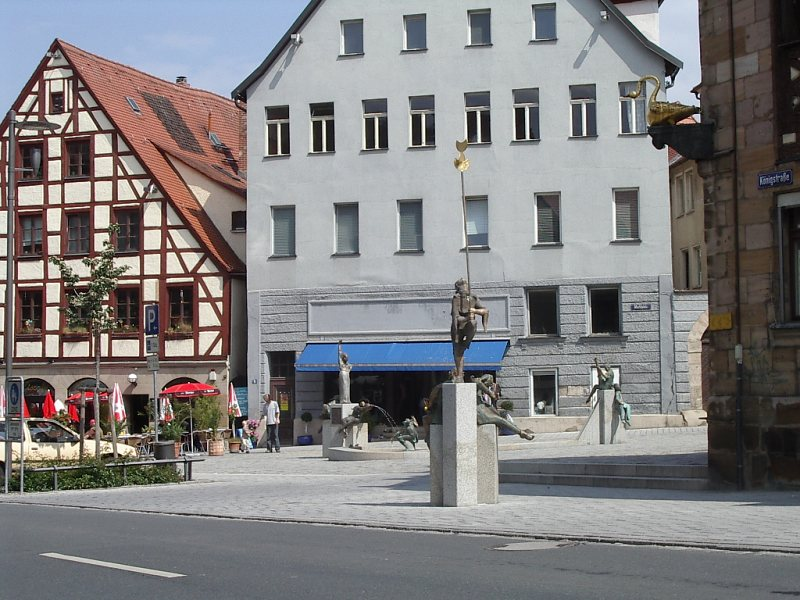
Gauklerbrunnen at the "Grüner Markt", 2004

Fürth survived the Second World War with less damage than most German cities, and many historic buildings remain. Fürth has a very high density of historic buildings and monuments per head of population (17 per 1000 inhabitants).

The city centre is typified by the streets with intact architecture from the 19th and early 20th centuries. In the old town, around the Church of St. Michael, there are ensembles of buildings from the 17th and 18th centuries. Of particular note is the Hornschuch Promenade with Gründerzeit and Jugendstil apartment houses. The Südstadt, the southern part of the town, also has many historic buildings, but these tend to be former workers' tenements, so the house fronts are less grand. A lot of frame and freestones houses from 17.–19. century can be found in quarters and suburbs, f.e. Poppenreuth, Burgfarrnbach, Vach and Dambach.

The Rathaus (town hall), built in the Italian style by Friedrich Bürklein between 1840 and 1850, is modelled on the Palazzo Vecchio in Florence. The "Glockenspiel" in the Rathaus is a mechanical music machine with 25 chromatically tuned cast bronze bells, similar to a carillon. It became nationally known through the daily playing of the rock classic "Stairway to Heaven" by the British rock group Led Zeppelin at 12:04 pm.

=== Museums ===
- The Jewish Museum in Franconia' (Königstraße 89), which also has a branch in Schnaittach, was opened in 1999. The main part of the house goes back to the 17th century; Jewish families lived here until the late 19th century. The stucco ceilings, a historic Sukkah and a Mikvah in the basement have remained intact. The museum is also meant to be a meeting place, and has a bookshop and a cafeteria.
- Fürth Radio museum (Kurgartenstraße 37)
- Stadtmuseum (Municipal/Town Museum), (Ottostr.2) at former Otto schoolhouse shows a lot of town history in a permanent exhibition and alternating special exhibitions
- The kunst galerie fürth (Königsplatz 1), which was opened at the end of 2002, is a place for modern art, with varying exhibitions.
- The Jakob-Henle-Haus houses a collection of dialysis technology.

=== Churches ===
The Protestant Church of St. Michael is the oldest building in Fürth. Its beginnings go back to around 1100, the 45-metre (150 ft) tower was added around 1400 at the beginning of the Late Gothic period, and most of the building work was carried out in the 15th century. The interior of the church is mainly Neo-Gothic in character, with most of the Late Gothic ornaments having been replaced in the 19th century. The only remaining late Gothic ornament is the tabernacle on the North wall; it is 6.8 metres (22 ft 4 in) high and was probably created around 1500–1510 by artists near to Adam Kraft. It is the church's most valuable work of art. Other churches with gothic parts from 14.–16. century are St.Johannis in Burgfarrnbach, St.Peter and Paul in Poppenreuth and St.Matthäus in Vach. St. Peter and Paul probably has some older parts, the previous building was probably founded around 900 – 1000 and was mother Church of many other churches f.e. St.Sebald in Nuremberg.

The Catholic Church of Our Lady (1824–1828) is a Classical building, as is the Protestant "Church of the Resurrection" (1825–26), originally belonging to the cemetery and therefore aligned in a north–south direction. In the Südstadt area are the Neo-Gothic Church of St. Paul and the Neo-Baroque Church of St. Henry and Kunigunde. Other churches include the Catholic Church of Christ the King (Christkönig), which was built in the 1970s.

=== Secular buildings ===
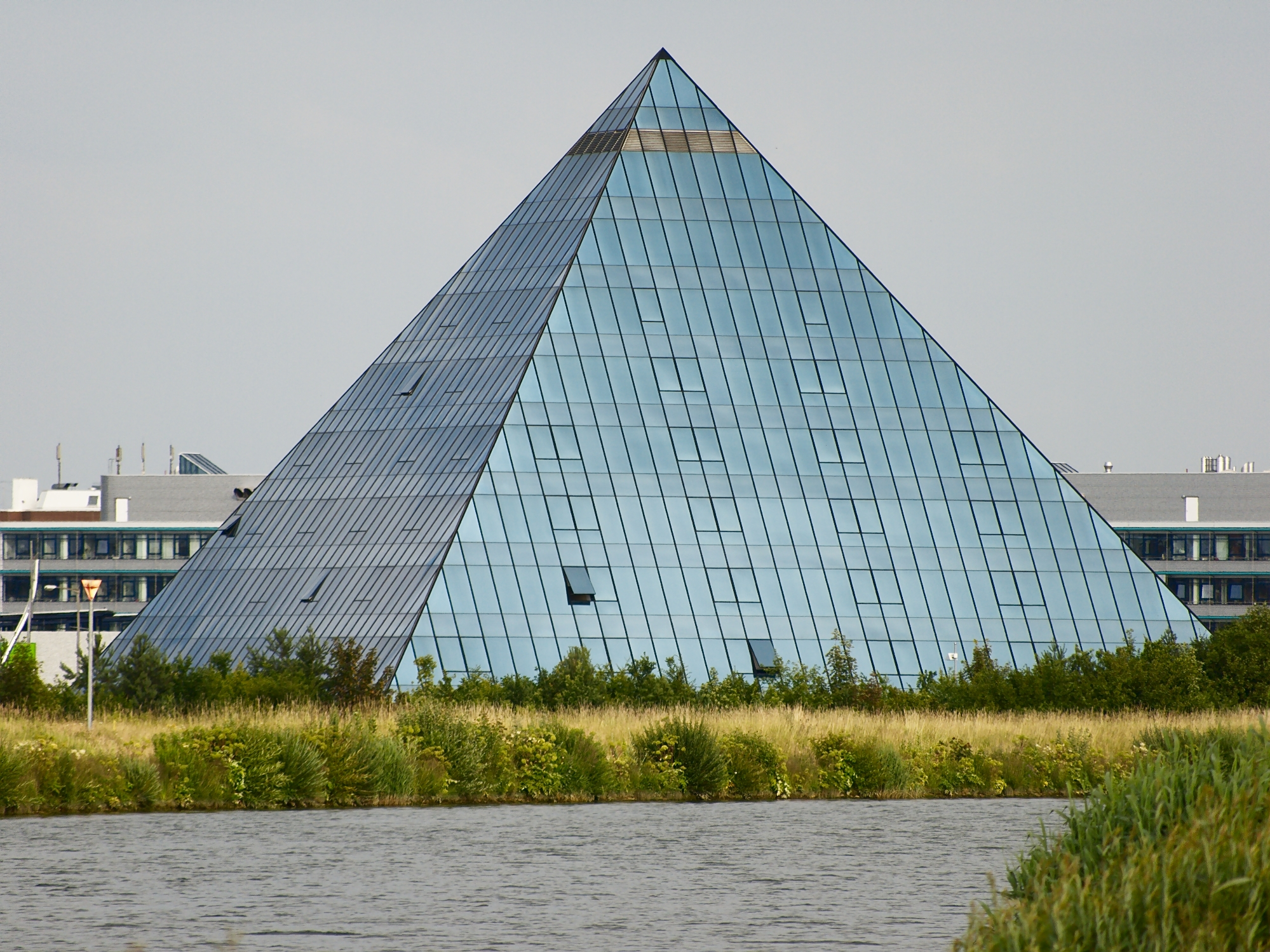
Hotel-Pyramide on the east bank of the Rhine–Main–Danube Canal with a glass outside facade

The renovated Liershof was built in 1621 as a two-story stone-block building with high house ends and a two-story timber-framed spire.

The Lochnersche Gartenhaus (Theaterstraße 33) was built about 1700; the polygonal staircase tower was probably added about 1750.

Fürth Rathaus (Town Hall), with its 55 m high tower in the Italian style, was built in 1840–50 by Georg Friedrich Christian Bürklein with the help of Eduard Bürklein, both students of Friedrich von Gärtner. The tower is modelled on the Palazzo Vecchio in Florence and is now the main landmark of Fürth. The Rathaus was built after Fürth was granted the right to self-administration.

The station building of the historic main rail station was designed by Eduard Rüber and built in 1863–1864. in front of main station is Centaurenbrunnen, in naturalistic and neo baroque style. 1890 it was created by Rudolf Maison and was built to celebrate railway and water supply in Fürth.

The former abattoir, now a "cultural" centre is to be found below the Stadthalle near the River Rednitz.

On the Schwabacher Straße is a brewery with buildings from the beginning of the 20th century.

The Gauklerbrunnen, (2004), created by Harro Frey at the Grüner Markt is the most recent fountain in Fürth; it comprises 3 independent groups of figures, two of which are connected by water elements.

Schloss Burgfarrnbach (Burgfarrnbach Palace) built in 1830 – 1834 is South Germany's largest neo-classical palace. It was built by Leonhard Schmidtner as residence for the counts of Pückler-Limpurg. Since the 1980s it is used as municipal archive, academic library, for concerts and special exhibitions and Stadtmuseum depot.

Schloss Steinach is a manor house from 17. century.

=== Parks ===
The Stadtpark (municipal park) is by the Pegnitz and there is a gradual transition to the water meadows further down the river. As well as paths and park benches, the park offers duck ponds, a children's playground, a minigolf course, a rose garden, a grassland orchard laid out in 2001, a few statues, and a botanical educational (school project) garden.

In the latter half of 2004 the Südstadtpark, on a former barracks, was opened to the public.

=== Regular events ===
- May: Burgfarrnbach fair (Bürgerfest)
- Spring: International Klezmer Festival
- Spring and Autumn: Grafflmarkt flea market
- Summer: Fürth Festival (in town centre)
- Summer:Grüne Nacht (Green Night) - local Folk & Blues Festival at "Grüner Markt" (market place)
- Summer: New Orleans Festival at "Fürther Freiheit"
- Summer: Hardhöhe festival
- Summer: saints' day fairs in various locations (fairs to celebrate the consecration of the local church)
- September/October: Michaeliskirchweih fair. This is one of the largest of such events in Bavaria, and also the largest and most important festivals in Fürth, it has been going on for more than 800 years. It starts on September 29 (Michaelmas), if it is a Saturday, or on the first Saturday following September 29). It usually lasts 12 days. In 2007 it lasted 16 days in celebration of Fürth's 1000th anniversary.
- December: Christmas market (Weihnachtsmarkt) at Fürther Freiheit
- December: Old Town Christmas (Altstadtweihnacht) organized by the Old Town Association (Altstadtverein) at Waagplatz.

=== Prizes awarded by the town of Fürth ===
Every two years, since 1996, Fürth has awarded the Jakob-Wassermann prize, a prize for literature in honour of Fürth's famous author Jakob Wassermann.

== Sport and leisure ==
=== Sport ===
In the sporting world, Fürth came to fame through its football club SpVgg Fürth, which was German football champion three times. Since merging with the football section of TSV Vestenbergsgreuth the club is now called SpVgg Greuther Fürth. After winning the 2nd Bundesliga in 2011-12, the team moved up to the top level Bundesliga for the first time. The football stadium is in Ronhof (Stadion am Laubenweg).

The baseball team Fürth Pirates was promoted to the premier national baseball league in 2002 and became vice-champion in the 2004 season.

Each August, Fürth plays host to the annual Paul Hunter Classic, which is now a pro-am minor ranking snooker event and part of the European Players Tour Championship.

=== Leisure ===
The largest public barbecue area within Fürth is on the Rednitz, near the railway line to Würzburg and the swimming pool. It is shaded by trees and has barbecue facilities and fixed seating. Here you can also enjoy the area of Uferpromenade, where you can stroll or cycle along the riverside of Rednitz.

There are minigolf courses in the Stadtpark, by the Rhine-Main-Danube Canal, near Burgfarrnbach, and by the Pegnitz, a little upstream from the confluence with the Rednitz and near the municipal cemetery.

== Notable people ==
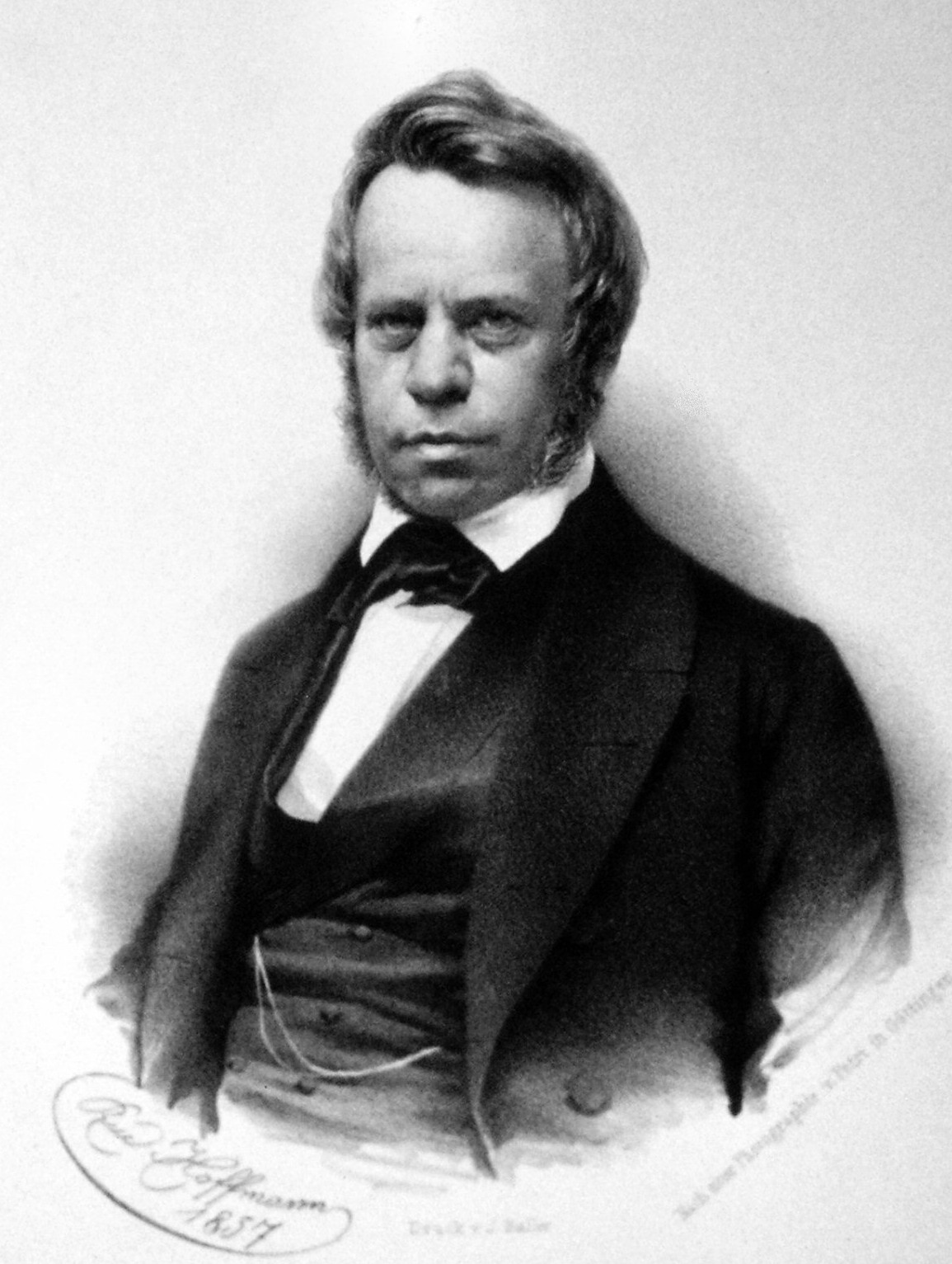
Jakob Henle

- Max Bernstein (1854–1925), lawyer, art and theatre critic and author
- Hans Böckler (1875–1951), German politician (SPD) and union leader
- Hermann Boehm (1884–1962), German eugenicist, professor of "racial hygiene" and SA-Sanitäts-Gruppenführer
- Moritz Ellinger (1830–1907), politician and New York City official
- Ludwig Erhard (1897–1977), politician (CDU), former German chancellor
- Roger C. Field (born 1945), inventor, designer
- Albert Forster (1902–1952), German Nazi governor executed for war crimes
- Max Grundig (1908–1989), founder of electronics company Grundig
- Paul Hartmann (1889–1977), German actor
- Moshe Heinemann (born 1937), renowned Jewish Orthodox Rabbi based in Baltimore, MD.
- Jakob Henle (1809–1885), anatomist, pathologist and doctor
- Ralph F. Hirschmann (1922–2009), biochemist who led synthesis of the first enzyme.
- Jacob Hirschorn (1829–1906), Mexican War veteran
- Heinrich Hoffmann (1885–1957), personal photographer of Adolf Hitler
- Wilhelm Ihne (1821–1902), classicist and historian
- Henry Kissinger (1923–2023), former United States Secretary of State
- Robert Kurz (1943–2012), communist theorist

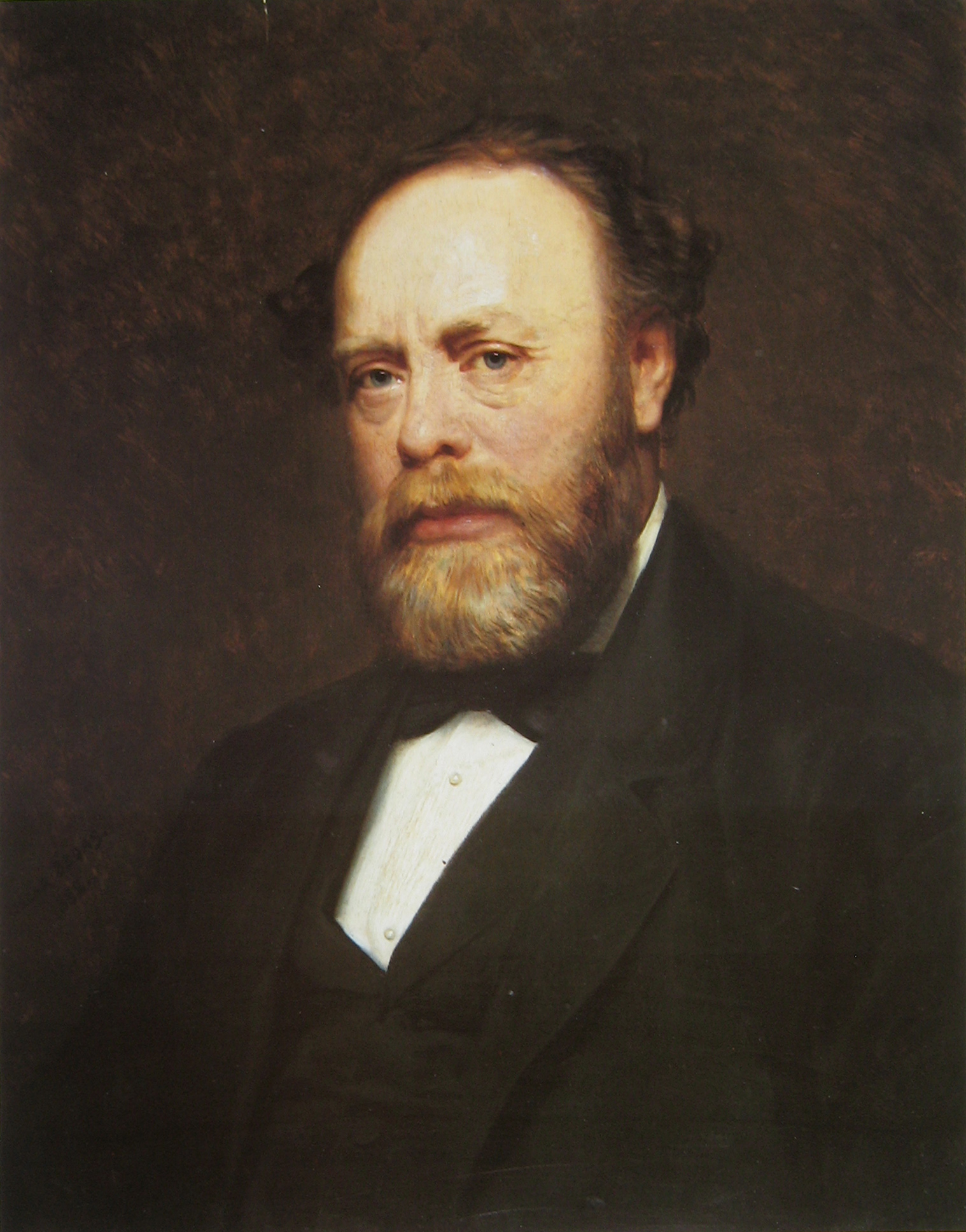
Leopold Ullstein by Oscar Begas, 1882

- Wilhelm Löhe (1808–1872), Lutheran pastor
- Jean Mandel (1911–1974), footballer and politician, Bavarian senator
- Alfred Louis Nathan (1870–1922), philanthropist
- Julius Ochs (1826–1888), father of Adolph Ochs, publisher of New York Times
- Arthur Rosenthal (1887–1959), mathematician
- Gustav Schickedanz (1895–1977), German entrepreneur
- Alfred Schwarzmann (1912–2000), gymnastic and olympic athlete
- Martin Segitz (1853–1927), union leader and politician (SPD)
- Leopold Ullstein (1826–1899), important German publisher
- Jakob Wassermann (1873–1934), writer and novelist
- Ruth Weiss (1924–2025), writer
- Moshe Heinemann (born 1937), famous Rabbi and Posek of Baltimore, Maryland USA.
- Marco Wittmann (born 1989), racing driver and 2-time DTM champion
