= Philipp Spitta (poet) =

German Protestant religious poet

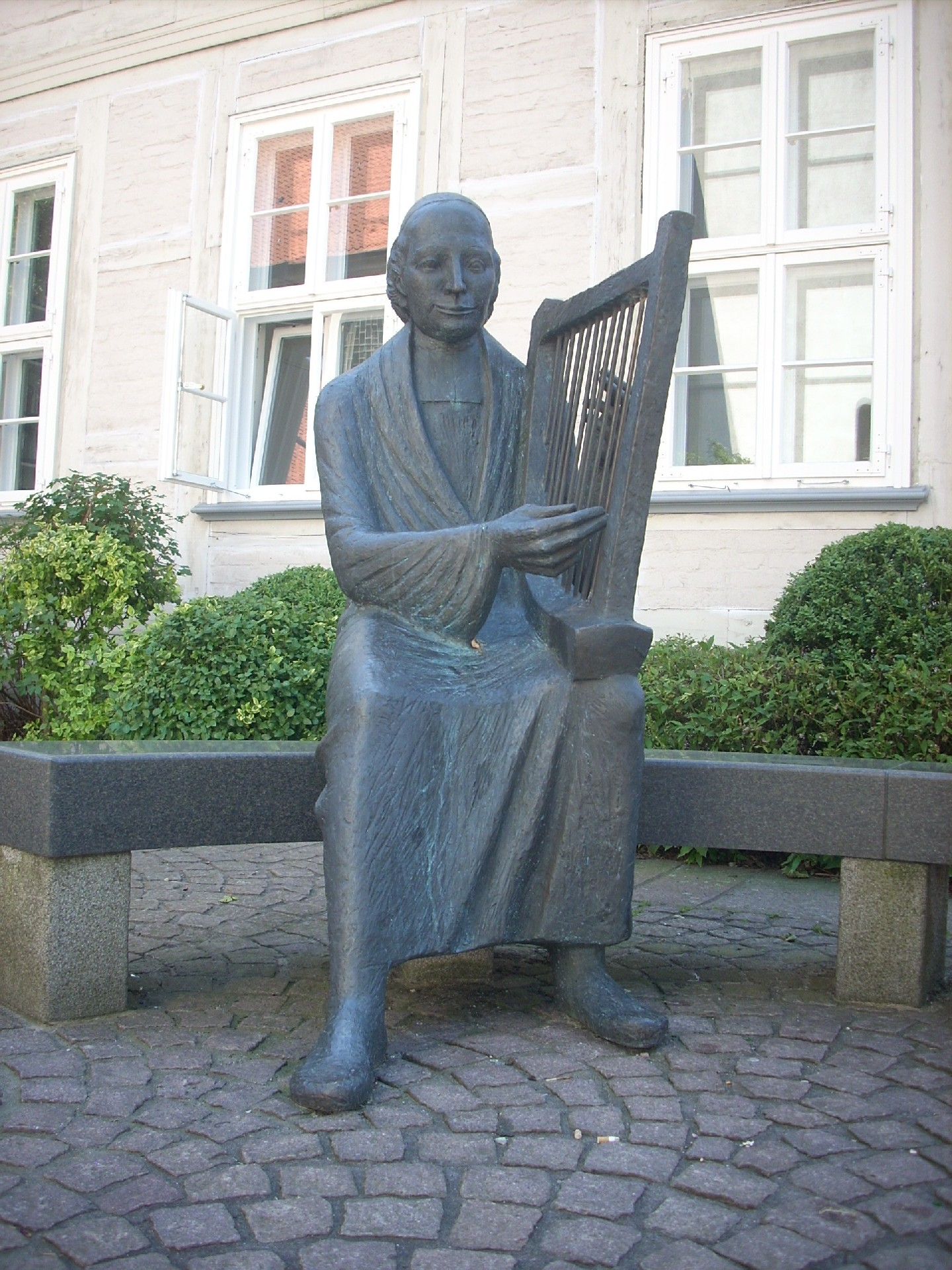
- Spitta memorial in the plaza of the superintendency at Burgdorf.

Karl Johann Philipp Spitta (1 August 1801 – 28 September 1859) was a German Protestant religious poet.

== Biography ==
Born in Hanover, he was educated at Göttingen, and from 1824 to 1828 he was a tutor near Lüneburg, and there wrote the most favored of his hymns. Afterwards he was vicar or pastor in several churches, and in 1859, shortly before his death, was made superintendent at Burgdorf.

== Hymns ==
His hymns, contained in Psalter und Harfe (1833; revised with biographical note by his son, Ludwig, 1890; 'Jubilee' ed., 1901), and in the Nachgelassene geistliche Lieder (1861 with frequent reprintings), rank high in the German spiritual songs of the 19th century, and attained great popularity, attributed by some to their freshness of thought, purity of style, and depth of sentiment. See also Lyra domestica (1st series, London, 1860; 2nd series, 1864). His "Freuet euch der schönen Erde" (Enjoy the beautiful earth) and the Pentecost hymn "O komm, du Geist der Wahrheit" are part of the modern Protestant hymnal Evangelisches Gesangbuch hymnal.

== Family ==
Among his ancestors was Jewish diarist Glückel of Hameln. Spitta's son Friedrich Spitta was a noted theologian. Another son, also named Philipp Spitta, was a musicologist, best known for his biography of Johann Sebastian Bach.
