= Venningen =

- Municipality
- Coat of arms

- Location of Venningen within Südliche Weinstraße district
- Interactive map of Venningen
- Location within Germany Location within Rhineland-Palatinate
- Coordinates: 49°16′47″N 8°10′31″E
- Country: Germany
- State: Rhineland-Palatinate
- District: Südliche Weinstraße
- Municipal assoc.: Edenkoben

Government
  - Mayor (2019–24): Jürgen Leibfried

Area
  - Total: 9.86 km^{2} (3.81 sq mi)
- Elevation: 134 m (440 ft)

Population (2025-12-31)
  - Total: 925
  - Density: 93.8/km^{2} (243/sq mi)
- Time zone: UTC+01:00 (CET)
  - Summer (DST): UTC+02:00 (CEST)
- Postal codes: 67482
- Dialling codes: 06323
- Vehicle registration: SÜW
- Website: www.venningen.de

Venningen (German pronunciation: [ˈfɛnɪŋən]) is a municipality in Südliche Weinstraße district, in Rhineland-Palatinate, western Germany.
