= Erlangen station =

Railway station in Erlangen, Germany

Erlangen
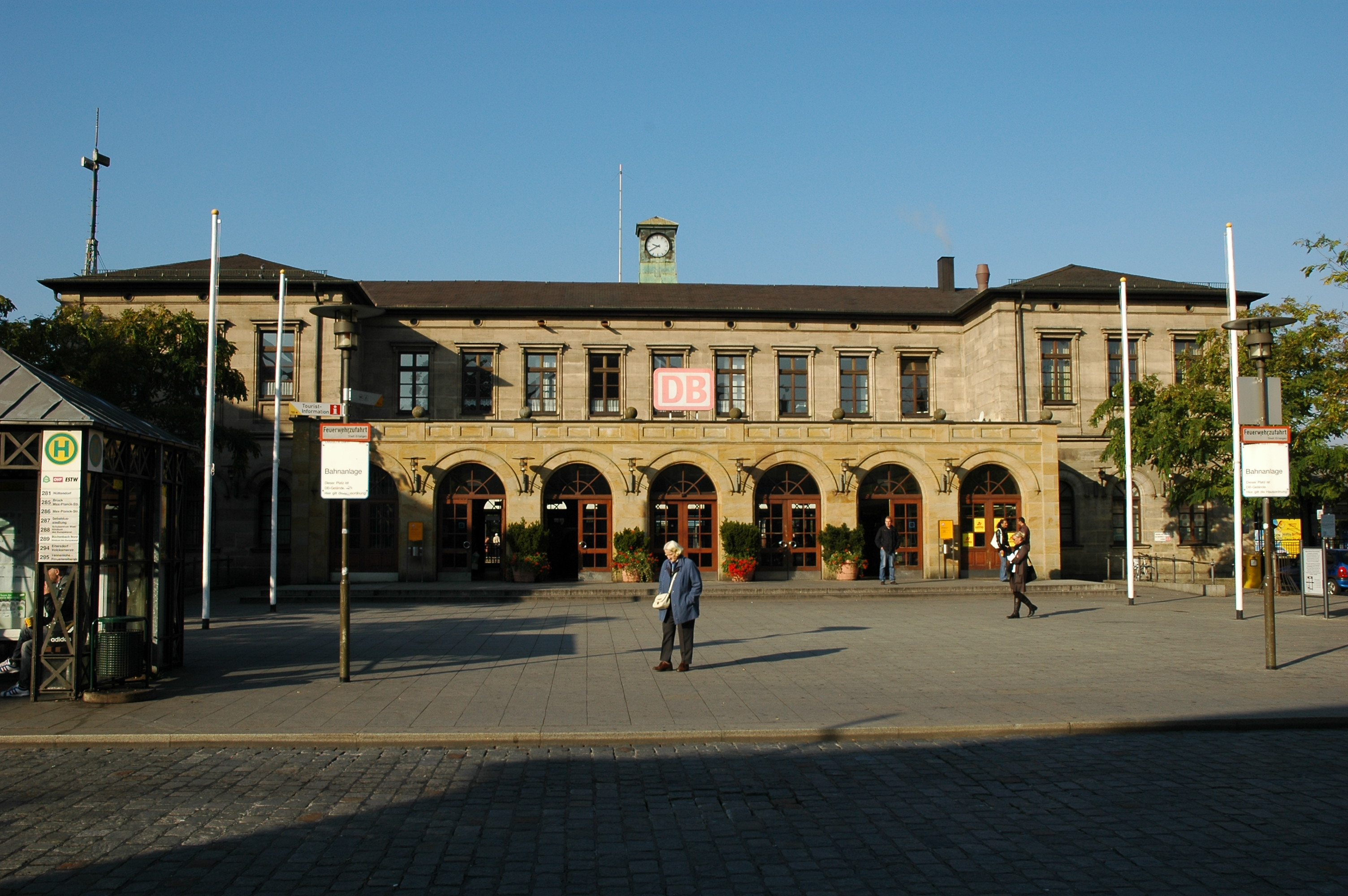
- Station forecourt and entrance building

General information
- Location: Bahnhofsplatz 1, Erlangen, Bavaria; Germany
- Coordinates: 49°35′46″N 11°0′7″E
- Owner: Deutsche Bahn
- Operator: DB Netz; DB Station&Service
- Lines: Nürnberg–Bamberg (KBS 820, 891.2); Erlangen–Gräfenberg (closed)
- Platforms: 4
- Connections: 30 200 201 202 202E 203 203E 205 208 209 209E 210 252 253 254 281 281S 283 284 285 286 287 289 290 293 294 294S 295 299 N20

Construction
- Accessible: Yes

Other information
- Station code: 1650
- DS100 code: NER
- IBNR: 8001844
- Category: 3
- Fare zone: VGN: 400
- Website: www.bahnhof.de; stationsdatenbank.de

History
- Opened: 25 August 1844
Services
Preceding station	DB Fernverkehr	Following station
Bamberg towards Berlin Gesundbrunnen	ICE 18	Nürnberg Hbf towards München Hbf
Bamberg towards Hamburg-Altona or Kiel Hbf	ICE 28	Nürnberg Hbf towards München Hbf
Bamberg towards Leipzig Hbf	IC 61	Nürnberg Hbf towards Karlsruhe Hbf
Preceding station	DB Regio Bayern	Following station
Forchheim (Oberfr) towards Saalfeld (Saale)	RE 14	Fürth Hbf towards Nürnberg Hbf
Forchheim (Oberfr) towards Sonneberg (Thür) Hbf	RE 19	Fürth Hbf towards Nürnberg Hbf
Forchheim (Oberfr) towards Würzburg Hbf	RE 20	Fürth Hbf towards Nürnberg Hbf
Forchheim (Oberfr) towards Sonneberg (Thür) Hbf	RE 28	Fürth Hbf towards Nürnberg Hbf
Preceding station	Nuremberg S-Bahn	Following station
Bubenreuth towards Bamberg	S1	Erlangen Paul-Gossen-Straße towards Neumarkt (Oberpfalz)
Location
- Location within Bavaria Location within Germany Location within Europe

Erlangen station is located on the Nuremberg–Bamberg railway in the German state of Bavaria. It is the oldest railway station of the city of Erlangen and it is the only station in the city served by long-distance trains. It is classified by Deutsche Bahn as a category 3 station and has four platform tracks.

== Location ==
The station is located on the western edge of the old town of Erlangen and extends on a north-south orientation from the Am Altstädter Friedhof overpass to the Güterhallenstraße overpass.

== Infrastructure ==
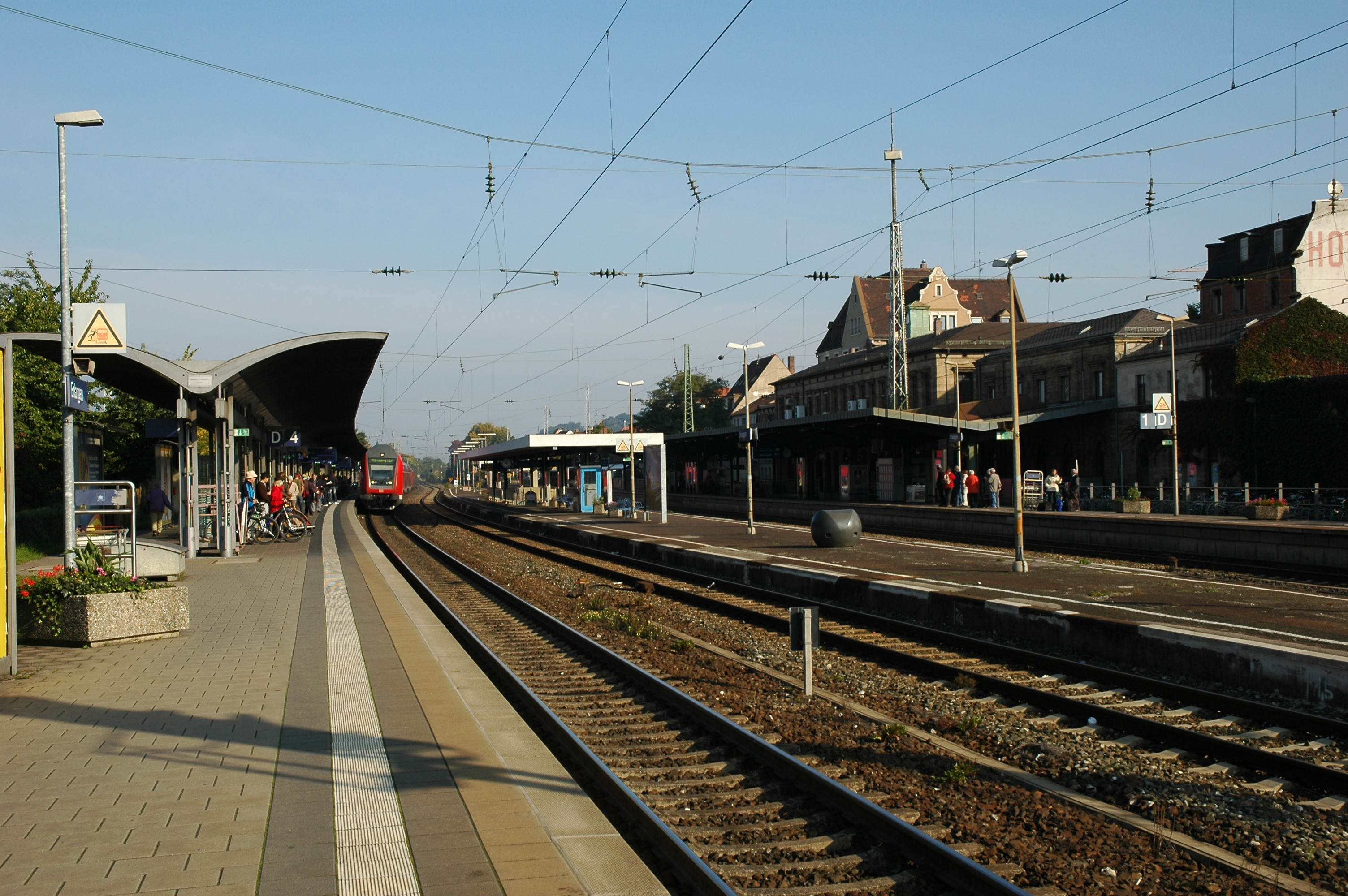
View of platform 4, to the right are platforms 3, 2 and 1, with the station building in the background

The station has four through tracks, of which tracks 1 and 4 are used for long-distance and regional trains to pass and tracks 2 (not used for normal services) and 3 are used for regional trains starting and ending in Erlangen. Each platform has digital destination displays and seating protected from the weather. All platforms are connected by a pedestrian underpass with each other and to the east of the station and to a bus station on the west of the railway property. The eastern entrance is via escalators through the entrance building and is via a barrier free ramp to the Westliche Stadtmauerstraße. The western access from the bus station is at ground level.

The main platform (track 1) is 421 metres (1,381 ft) long and has cover provided by the entrance building. It is accessible by a ramp and stairs from street level. Tracks 2 and 3 are next to an island platform of the same length, which is partly covered and is connected to the pedestrian tunnel by stairs (on both sides of the tunnel) and a lift. This platform was fully refurbished in 2012. Track 4 is next to a 383-metre (1,257 ft) long side platform, which is partly covered. It is connected to the pedestrian underpass from both sides via fixed stairs. Barrier-free access to platform 4 is provided by a ramp from the pedestrian underpass at the northern end of the platform and from Friedrich-List-Strasse to the southern end of the platform. All platforms are 76 centimetres (30 in) high.

In the station building there is a part-time ticket office and a waiting room. There is also a station bookstore, catering and sanitary facilities. There are a total of 1,262 bicycle parking spaces that are partly covered on both sides of the station. On the west side there are also 2,136 park-and-ride parking spaces for cars.

== Rail services ==
In long-distance services, the station is served by line 28 (Hamburg–Berlin–Halle–Erfurt–Erlangen–Nuremberg–Augsburg/Ingolstadt–Munich) at two-hour intervals, which is operated by ICE 1 multiple units. In the 2026 timetable, the following long-distance services stop at the station:

Line	Route	Frequency
ICE 18	Berlin Gesundbrunnen – Berlin – Halle – Erfurt – Erlangen – Nuremberg – Augsburg – Munich	Some trains
ICE 28	Hamburg-Altona – Hamburg – Berlin – Leipzig – Erfurt – Erlangen – Nuremberg – Munich	Every 2 hours
IC 61	Karlsruhe – Pforzheim – Stuttgart – Crailsheim – Ansbach – Nuremberg – Erlangen – Bamberg – Lichtenfels – Kronach – Saalfeld – Jena-Göschwitz – Jena Paradies – Naumburg – Weißenfels – Leipzig	2 train pairs

=== Regional services ===
In regional services, the station is served by Regional-Express services on timetable route 820 (Nuremberg–Fürth–Erlangen–Forchheim–Bamberg–Lichtenfels–Sonnenberg) and route 891.2 (Nuremberg–Fürth–Erlangen–Forchheim). The RE trains are operated with Talent 2 services running at up to 160 kilometres per hour (100 mph). These services are designated as line R2 by the Greater Nuremberg Transport Association (Verkehrsverbund Großraum Nürnberg, VGN). Since December 2010, Nuremberg S-Bahn line S1 has also run to Erlangen station. In the 2026 timetable, the following regional services stop at the station:

Line	Route			Frequency	Rolling stock
RE 42	Franken-Thüringen-Express: Nuremberg – Fürth – Erlangen – Forchheim – Hirschaid – Bamberg	– Lichtenfels – Saalfeld – Jena – Leipzig		Every 2 hours	Talent 2
RE 20	Franken-Thüringen-Express: Nuremberg – Fürth – Erlangen – Forchheim – Hirschaid – Bamberg	– Schweinfurt – Würzburg		Every 2 hours	Talent 2
RE 49	Franken-Thüringen-Express: Nuremberg – Fürth – Erlangen – Forchheim – Hirschaid – Bamberg	– Lichtenfels	– Coburg – Sonneberg	Every 2 hours	Talent 2
RE 14	Franken-Thüringen-Express: Nuremberg – Fürth – Erlangen – Forchheim – Hirschaid – Bamberg	– Lichtenfels	– Kronach – Saalfeld	Every 2 hours	Talent 2
RE 19	Franken-Thüringen-Express: Nuremberg – Fürth – Erlangen – Forchheim – Hirschaid – Bamberg	– Coburg (– Sonneberg)		Every 2 hours	Siemens Vectron+doubledeck coaches
S1	Erlangen – Erlangen-Bruck – Eltersdorf – Fürth-Unterfarrnbach – Nuremberg			Some trains	Class 111+doubledeck coaches
S1	(Bamberg –) Forchheim – Erlangen – Fürth – Nuremberg – Lauf – Hersbruck			Hourly	Alstom Coradia Continental
S1	Bamberg – Hirschaid – Forchheim – Erlangen – Fürth – Nuremberg – Lauf – Hersbruck – Hartmannshof			Hourly	Alstom Coradia Continental

East of the station is the Hauptbahnhof bus stop, formerly called Bahnhofsplatz, which is served by city bus routes 281, 283–289 and 293–295 operated by Erlanger Stadtwerke (the city utility), by routes 20, 30 and 30E operated by Verkehrs-Aktiengesellschaft Nürnberg (VAG, the Nuremberg municipal public transport company), and by regional bus routes 202, 203, 205 and 253 operated by Omnibusverkehr Franken (OVF, a regional bus company, based in Nuremberg and owned by Deutsche Bahn). The bus station to the west of the station is served by regional bus routes 201, 208–210 and 254 operated by OVF.

== Architecture ==
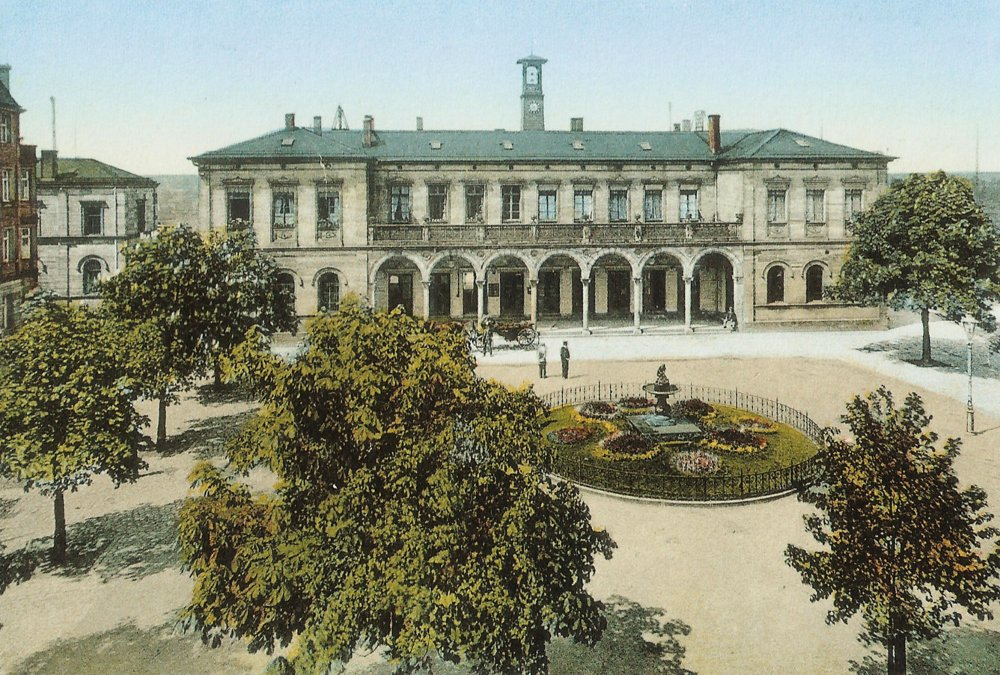
Erlangen station, about 1910

The now listed station building was designed by Eduard Rüber and built as a single-storey sandstone building. It consisted of an open central building which had waiting rooms for passengers as extensions to the north and south. Between 1868 and 1870, the first reconstruction was carried out by Friedrich Bürklein, in which the entire building was enlarged and the veranda was converted into an open loggia with Renaissance Revival elements. The loggia was enclosed in 1919 and it was replaced in the 1950s by a modern waiting room. During the last renovation in 1991, the loggia was restored to its appearance before the postwar modernisation.

== History ==
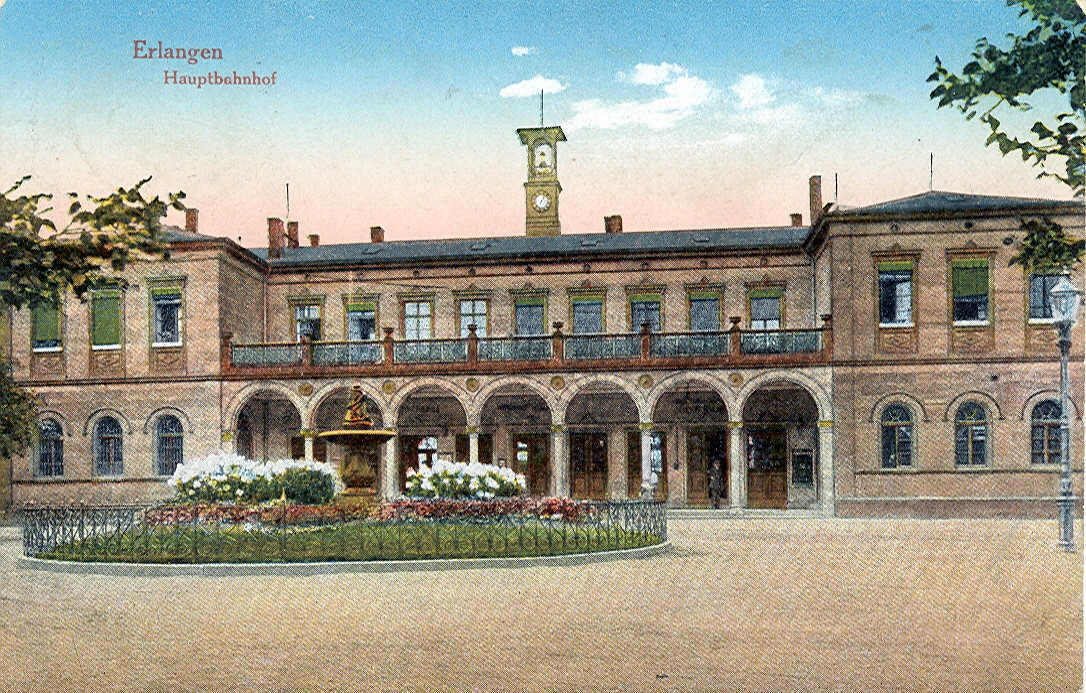
Erlangen station, about 1917

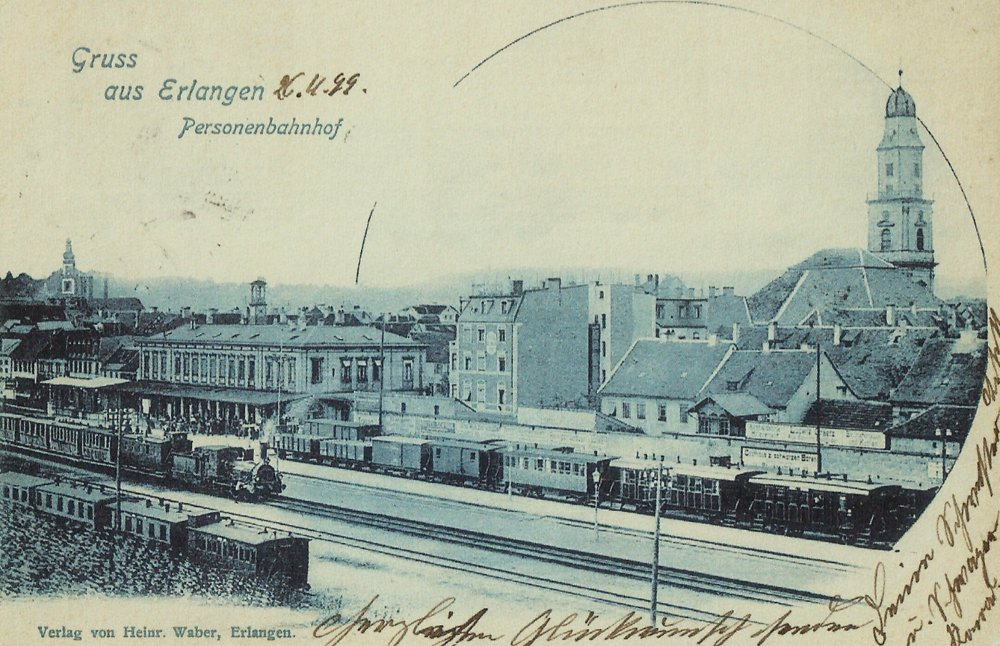
Erlangen station from the south-west, about 1899

The station was opened, along with Nuremberg–Bamberg section of the Ludwig South-North Railway, by the Bavarian State Railway on 25 August 1844, the birthday of King Ludwig I. However, regular operations on the line commenced only on 1 September 1844, on completion of all construction work, and passenger service started a month later on 1 October 1844. The Erlangen-Gräfenberg secondary railway (Sekundärbahn Erlangen–Gräfenberg, known as the Seku) was opened to the station on 17 November 1886. The trains of the secondary line usually ended at a platform south of the station building. Due to the increasing volume of traffic, the single-track Nuremberg–Bamberg line was no longer sufficient and the line was duplicated, starting from the Nuremberg end in 1891, and put into operation from Fürth in 1892. On 1 October 1894, a suburban service commenced from Nürnberg Hauptbahnhof, with one of the services ending in Erlangen. The station was also the terminus of passenger trains on the Erlangen-Bruck–Herzogenaurach railway until passenger operations ended on 28 September 1984. The station has been served by electrically-operated services since 15 May 1939. After the Second World War and the division of Germany, the main traffic flow on the Nuremberg–Bamberg line shifted to the north on the line via Würzburg and thus the station was now served by long-distance services on this route. It lost its function as a junction with the closure of the Seku on 17 February 1963. In the late 1960s, an improved local transport service with dense regular-interval services was introduced on the main lines in Nuremberg, as a precursor to a possible S-Bahn system, and Erlangen was integrated in this network. The plans were confirmed in the 1980s and it was agreed that Erlangen would be included in the second stage of the Nuremberg S-Bahn network, although it was included from the beginning in the Greater Nuremberg Transport Association, which was founded on 27 September 1987. After the fall of the Wall and the reunification, long-distance services to Berlin improved considerably.

The station's track layout and infrastructure were modified in preparation for the opening of Nuremberg–Erfurt high-speed railway and the extension of the S-Bahn to Forchheim. As a result, the two outer tracks (1 and 4) continue to be used by long-distance and fast regional services and the two middle tracks (2 and 3) are reserved for the S-Bahn, for which the existing platform has been raised to the same height as the S-Bahn. The double track connection between track 2 and 3 at the southern end of the platform was removed and replaced by connections between all tracks to the north of the station. A reversing track was built for S-Bahn trains terminating in Erlangen between the bridge over Martinsbühler Straße and the bridge over the Schwabach. As part of the development, track 1 was rebuilt so that trains can travel through the station at a speed of 160 km/h.
