= Forchheim (Oberfr) station =

Railway station in Germany

Forchheim (Oberfr)
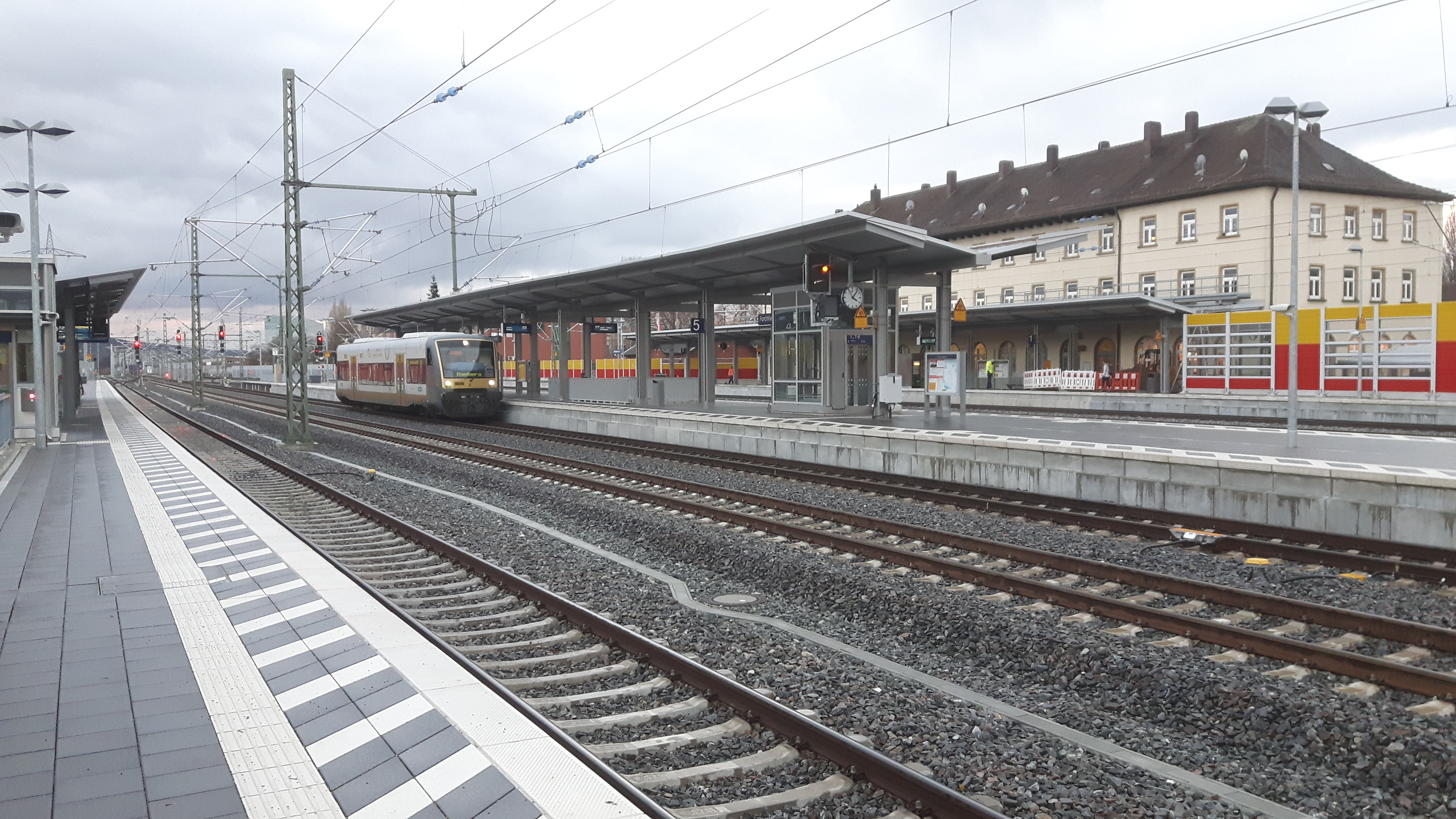
- The station in 2018

General information
- Location: Bahnhofsplatz 9 Forchheim, Bavaria; Germany
- Coordinates: 49°43′02″N 11°04′12″E
- Owner: DB Netz
- Operator: DB Station&Service
- Lines: Nuremberg–Bamberg line; Forchheim–Behringersmühle line; Forchheim–Höchstadt line (closed)
- Distance: 38.3 km (23.8 mi) from Nürnberg Hauptbahnhof
- Platforms: 2 island platforms; 1 side platform
- Tracks: 5
- Train operators: agilis; DB Regio Bayern

Other information
- Station code: 1830
- DS100 code: NFO
- IBNR: 8002024
- Category: 4
- Fare zone: VGN: 441
- Website: www.bahnhof.de

Services
Preceding station	DB Regio Bayern	Following station
Hirschaid towards Saalfeld (Saale)	RE 14	Erlangen towards Nürnberg Hbf
Hirschaid towards Sonneberg (Thür) Hbf	RE 19	Erlangen towards Nürnberg Hbf
Hirschaid towards Würzburg Hbf	RE 20	Erlangen towards Nürnberg Hbf
Hirschaid towards Sonneberg (Thür) Hbf	RE 28	Erlangen towards Nürnberg Hbf
Preceding station		Following station
Eggolsheim towards Lichtenfels	RB 22	Pinzberg towards Ebermannstadt
Preceding station	Nuremberg S-Bahn	Following station
Eggolsheim towards Bamberg	S1	Kersbach towards Neumarkt (Oberpfalz)
Location

Forchheim (Oberfr) station is a railway station in the town of Forchheim, in the Forchheim district in Upper Franconia, Germany. The station is located at the junction of the Nuremberg–Bamberg and Forchheim–Behringersmühle lines of Deutsche Bahn.
