= Coburg–Sonneberg railway =

Railway line in Bavaria and Thuringia, Germany

Coburg–Sonneberg
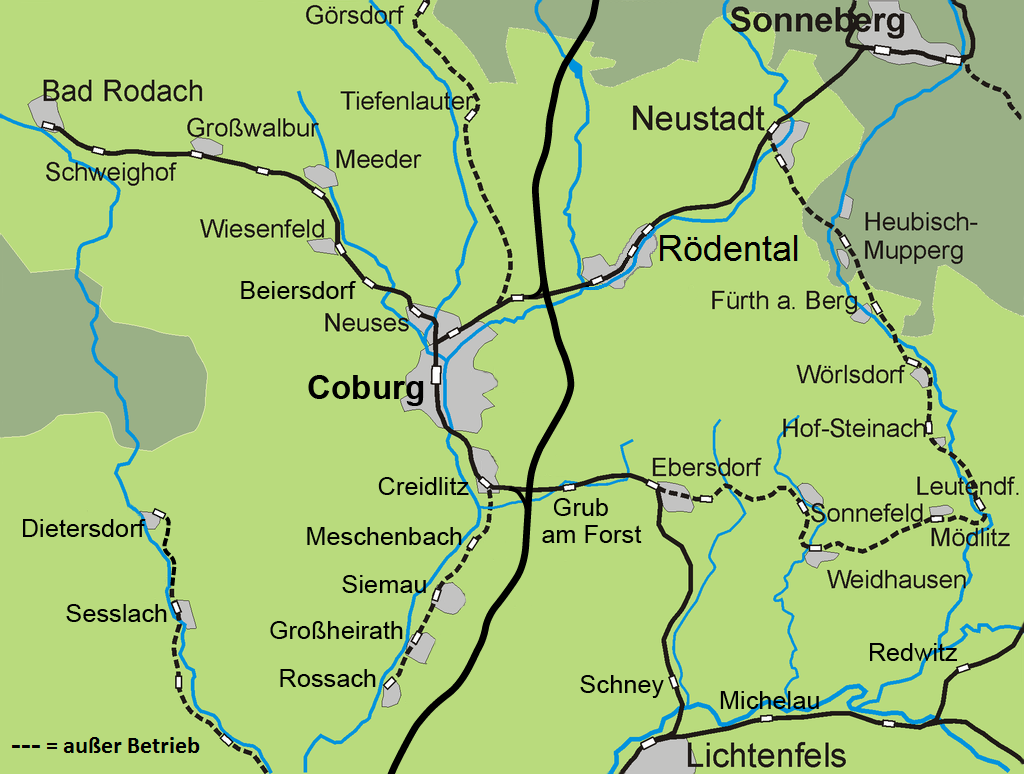

Overview
- Line number: 5121
- Locale: Bavaria, Germany

Service
- Route number: 820

Technical
- Line length: 19.5 km (12.1 mi)
- Track gauge: 1,435 mm (4 ft 8 1/2 in) standard gauge
- Electrification: 15 kV/16.7 Hz AC overhead catenary

The Coburg–Sonneberg railway is a single-track, electrified, 20 kilometre-long main line railway from Coburg in the German state of Bavaria via Neustadt to Sonneberg in Thuringia. It was opened in 1858 and is one of the oldest railways in Germany.

== History ==
In 1841 the Grand Duchy of Saxe-Weimar-Eisenach and the duchies of Saxe-Coburg and Gotha and Saxe-Meiningen signed a treaty to establish a railway from Eisenach to Coburg. This also covered the construction of a line from Coburg to Sonneberg, connecting Sonneberg with the city of Meiningen and south to Bavaria.

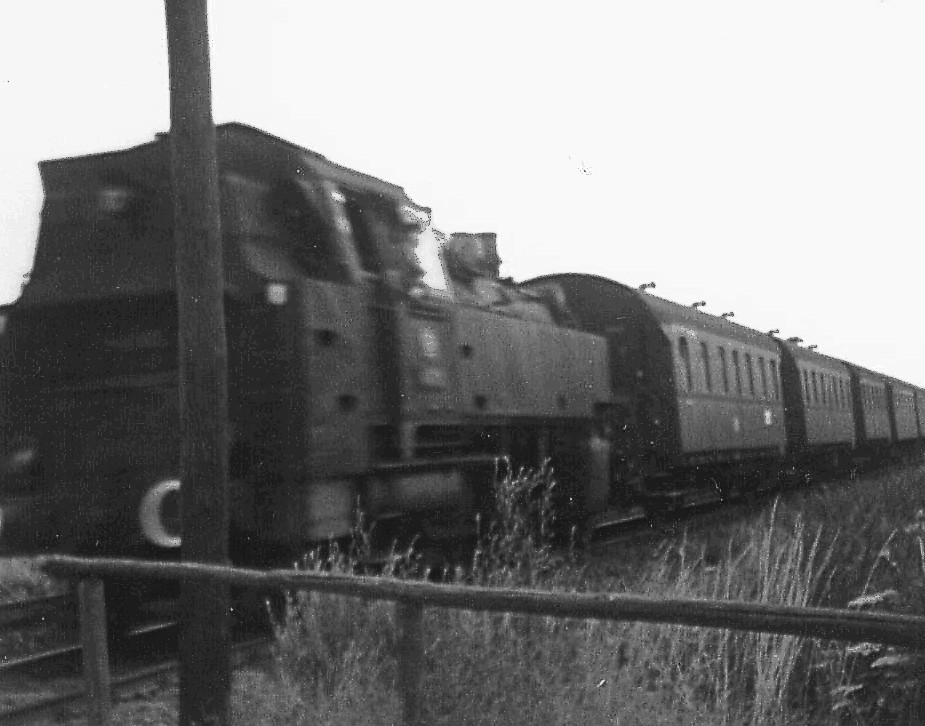
Passenger train with class 86 steam locomotive at Coburg, Kalenderweg level crossing in 1958

in 1855 the newly formed Werra Railway Company (Werra-Eisenbahn-Gesellschaft) received a concession to build and operate the line and on 1 November 1858 the Werra Railway was opened. 28 years later, on 1 October 1886, a 19.2 km long extension was opened from Sonneberg to Lauscha.

On 1 October 1895, the Werra-Railway Company, including this line, was acquired by the Prussian government and it was administered by the railway administration of the Deutsche Reichsbahn in Erfurt until 1945. The timetable of the German State Railway (Deutsche Reichsbahn) in 1939 included 14 daily passenger trains and an express train in each direction with a running time on the line of 20 minutes for the expresses.

After the occupation by Thuringia by Soviet troops in July 1945, operations between Sonneberg and Neustadt were interrupted. On 1 September 1947, freight services resumed over the Inner German Border, with a break during the Berlin Blockade. Two pairs of freight trains each day had been approved by the occupying powers for the transport of coke from Neustadt to Sonneberg, but traffic was small and irregular. On 30 September 1951 the last run took place, which was followed by the dismantling of the tracks in the spring of 1952.

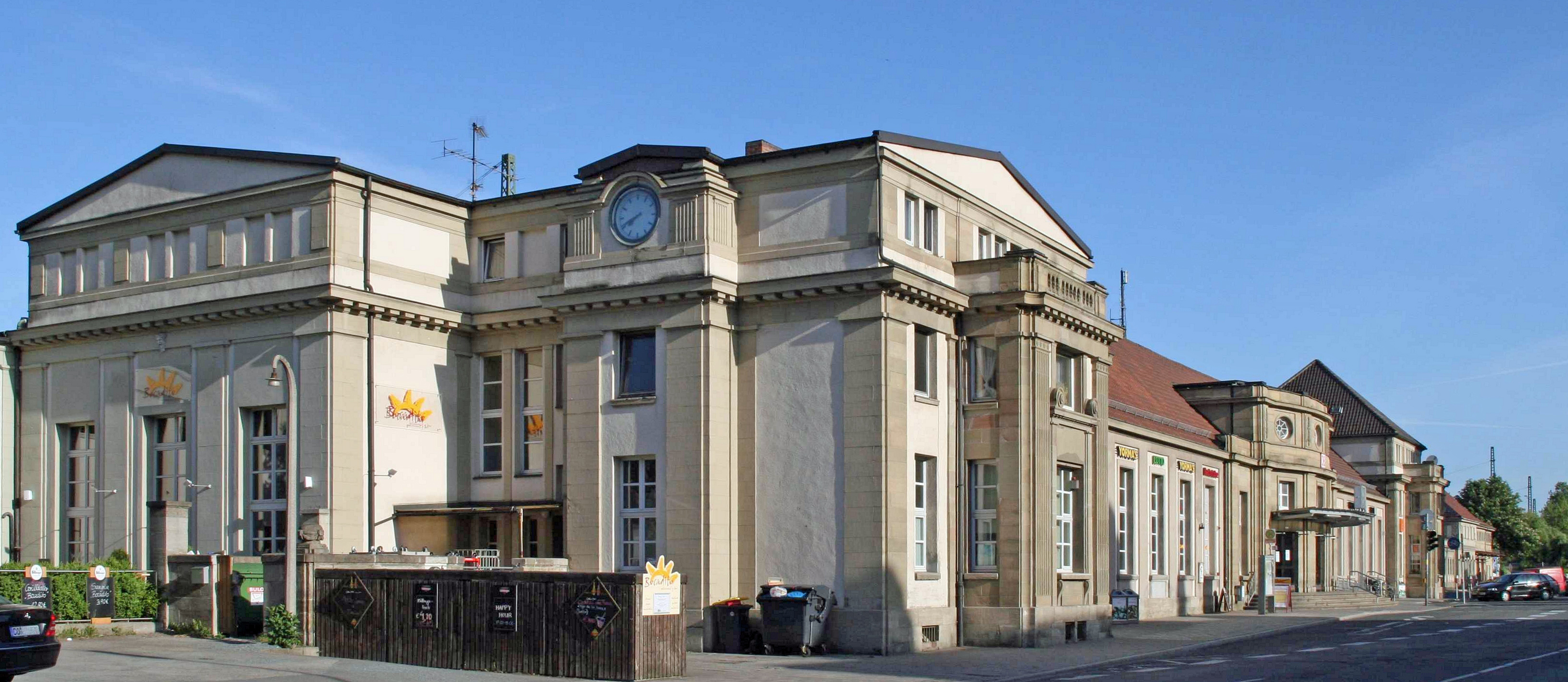
Coburg station

The Coburg–Neustadt section was electrified in 1975 with a financial subsidy from the State of Bavaria. This allowed the avoiding of a locomotive change to a class 86 steam locomotive or a class 280 diesel locomotive in Coburg. Instead the class 144 electric locomotives continued to Neustadt. In 1979, Oeslau station was renamed Rödental station and a new station building was opened. A year later rail operation on weekends were abandoned.

After the fall of the Inner German Border the line through the gap between Neustadt and Sonneberg was immediately reinstated. Some of the land had to be bought back as only a few years earlier part of the line had been sold to the Bavarian forest service. On 28 September 1991 the 3.5 km long, former cross-border section from Neustadt to Sonneberg was returned to service, it was electrified from the first day.

From 2004 to 2006, DB Station&Service rehabilitated platforms along the line (at Neustadt, Mönchröden and Rödental stations) and adapted them for disabled people. In addition, the new halts of Coburg Nord and Rödental Mitte were built and put into operation on 11 December 2005.

== Operations ==
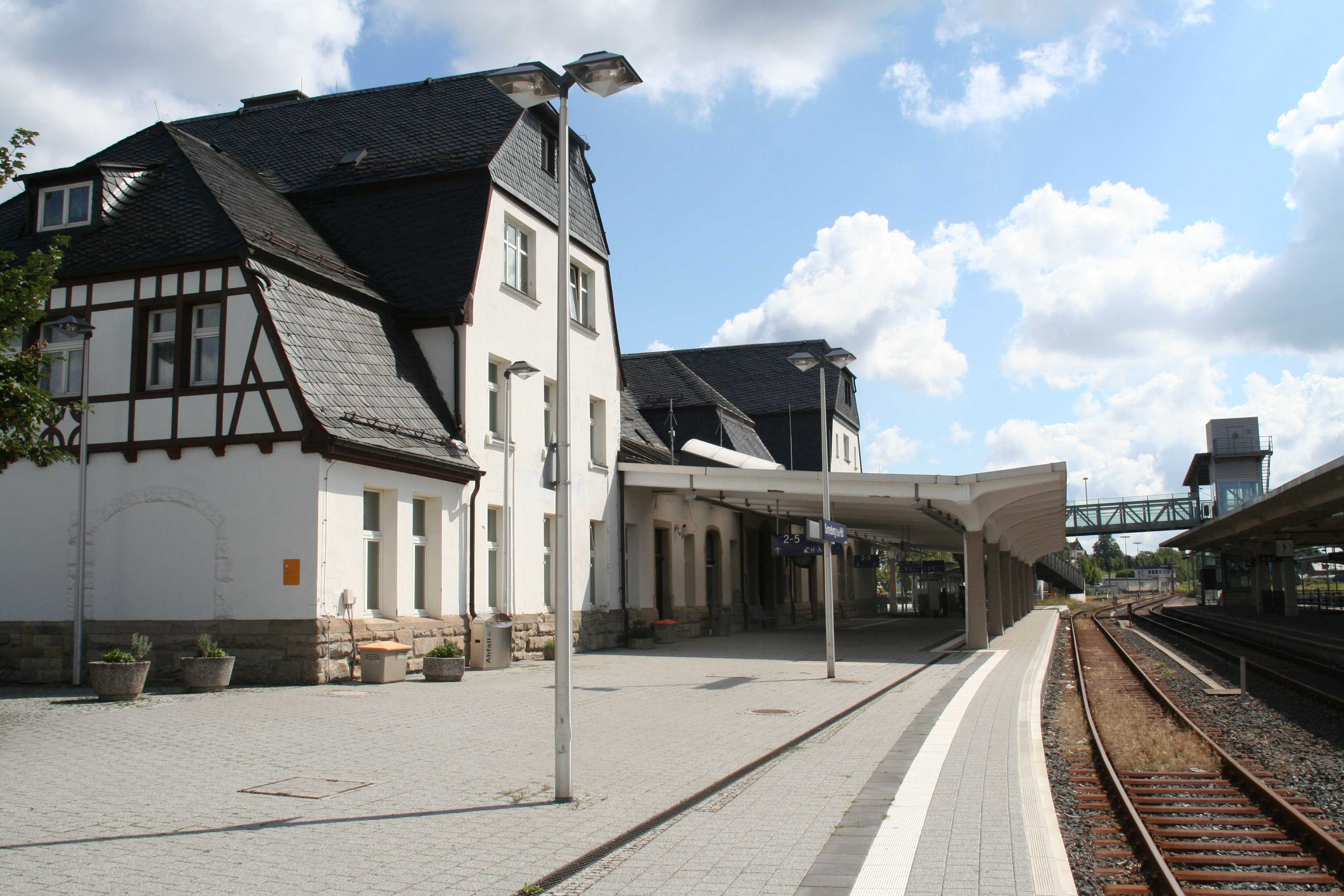
Sonneberg Hauptbahnhof

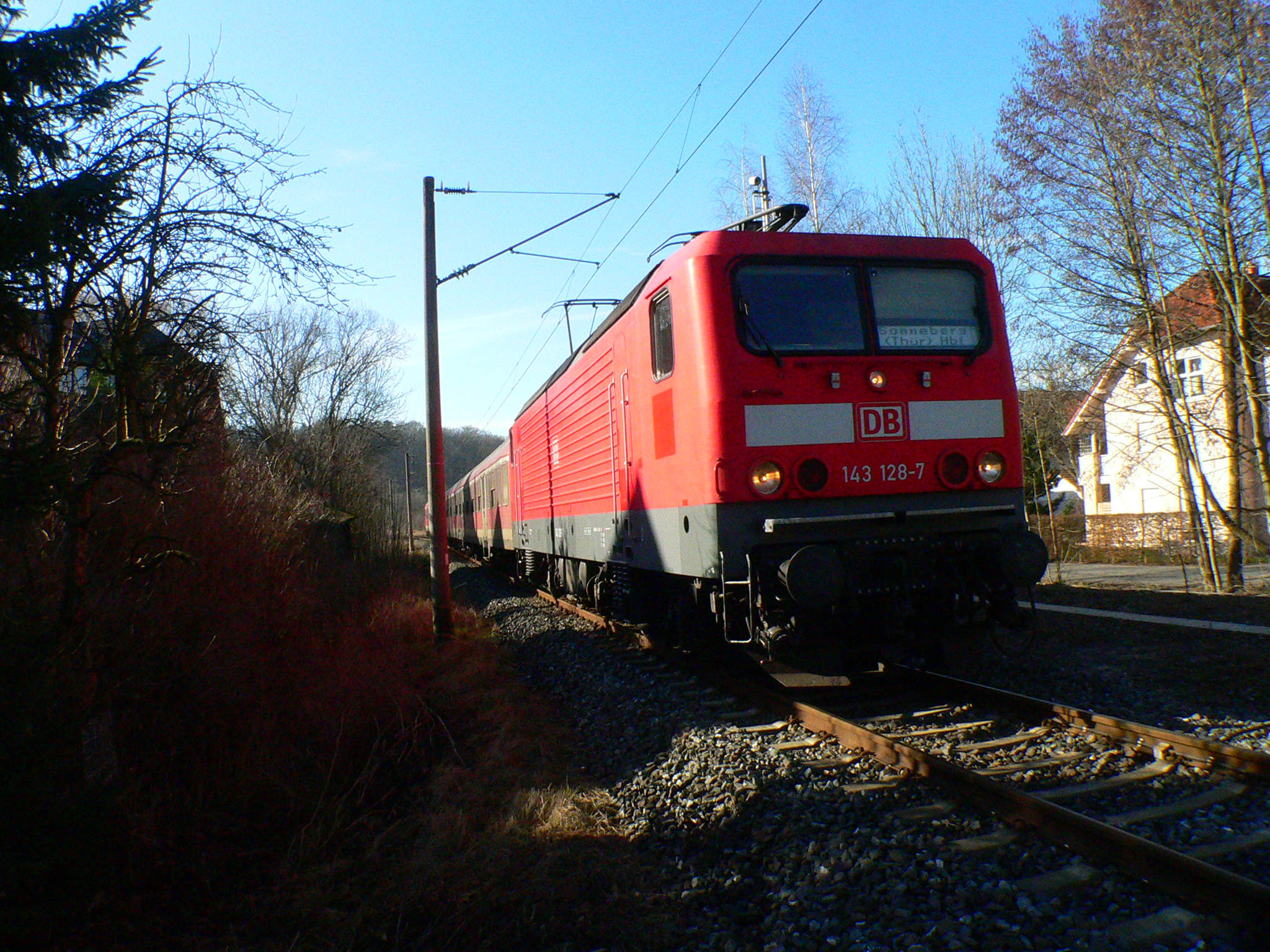
Train hauled by 143-128 at Coburg–Kalenderweg level crossing in 2008

Deutsche Bahn Regional-Express trains run on the line every hour (route number 820). They run to Bamberg and on to Nuremberg, alternating via Lichtenfels and via Nuremberg–Erfurt high-speed railway. Trains are usually requiring 22 minutes for the route, stopping at all stations. The regional express are operated by Bombardier Talent 2 (class 442) sets and Vectron locomotives with double-deck carriages.

Scheduled freight traffic has been re-established. When required, IntEgro Verkehr GmbH operates container trains from Monday to Fridays from Hof to Sonneberg Ost and return.
