= Schwabach station =

Railway station in Schwabach, Germany

Schwabach
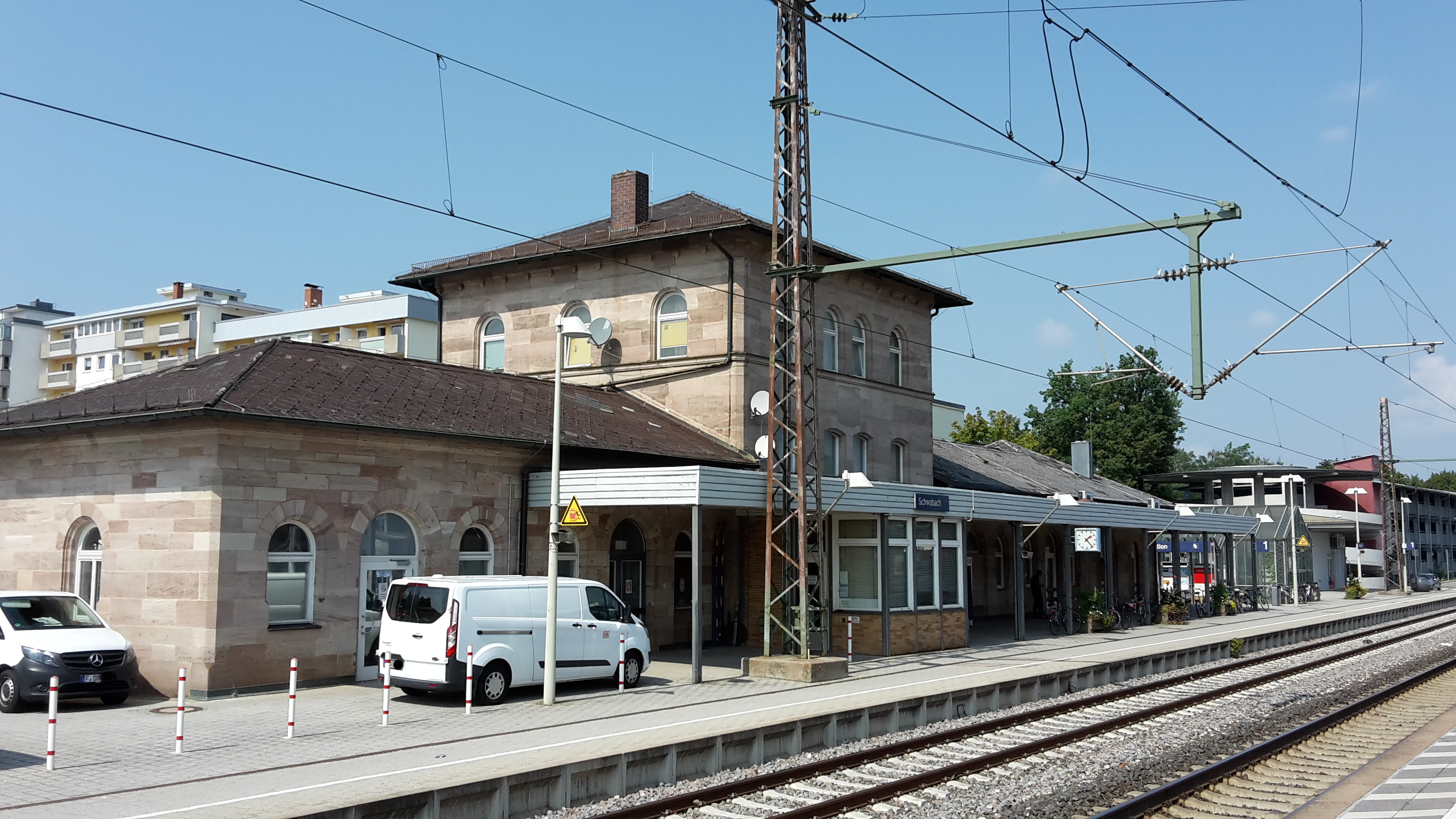
- The station in 2019

General information
- Location: Bahnhofstraße 45; Schwabach, Bavaria; Germany
- Coordinates: 49°19′33″N 11°02′07″E
- Elevation: 339 m (1,112 ft)
- Owner: DB Netz
- Operator: DB Station&Service
- Lines: Nuremberg–Roth line (KBS 890.2); Nuremberg–Augsburg line (KBS 910)
- Distance: 14.9 km (9.3 mi) from Nürnberg Hbf
- Platforms: 2 island platforms; 1 side platform
- Tracks: 5
- Train operators: DB Regio Bayern
- Connections: 61 607 661 662 663 664 665 673 676 677 678

Other information
- Station code: 5696
- DS100 code: NSC
- IBNR: 8005439
- Category: 3
- Fare zone: VGN: 602 and 611
- Website: www.bahnhof.de

Services
Preceding station	DB Regio Bayern	Following station
Roth towards Augsburg Hbf	RE 16	Nürnberg Hbf Terminus
Roth towards Treuchtlingen	RE 60	Nürnberg Hbf Terminus
Roth towards München Hbf	RB 16	Nürnberg Hbf Terminus
Preceding station	Nuremberg S-Bahn	Following station
Rednitzhembach towards Roth	S2	Schwabach-Limbach towards Hartmannshof
Location

Schwabach station is a railway station in the municipality of Schwabach, located in Middle Franconia, Germany. The station is on the Nuremberg–Augsburg and Nuremberg–Roth lines of Deutsche Bahn.
