= Opernhaus station =

Metro station in Nuremberg, Germany

Opernhaus
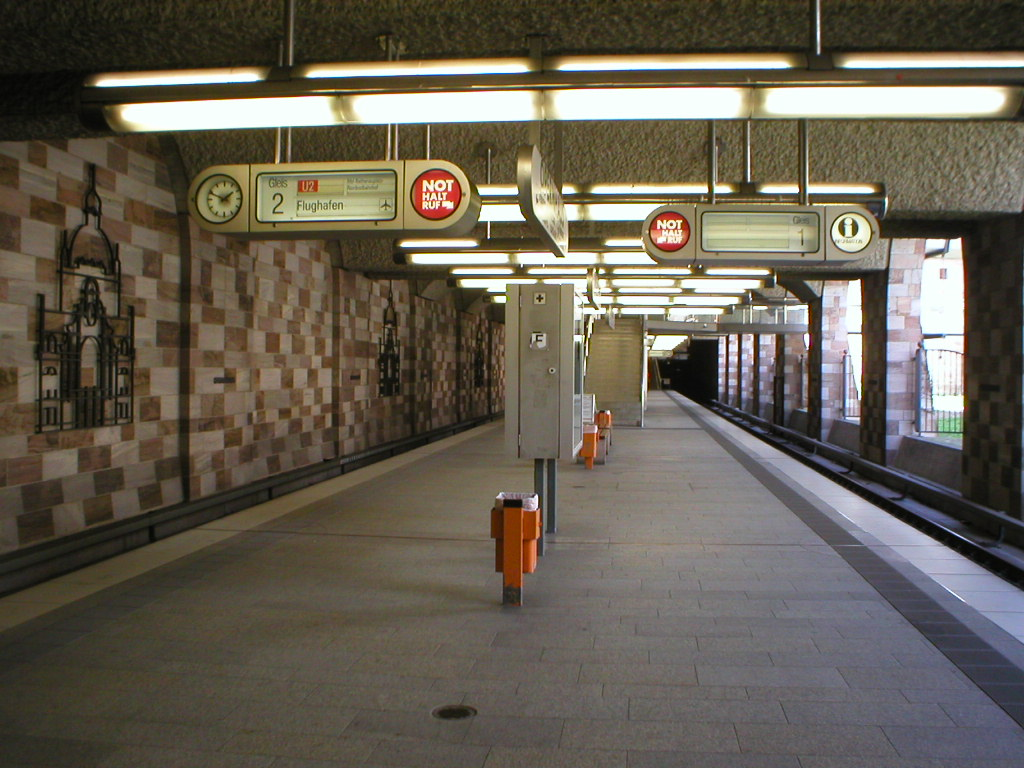

General information
- Location: Frauentorgraben; 90443 Nürnberg, Germany
- Coordinates: 49.4467703°N 11.0750068°E
- System: Nuremberg U-Bahn station
- Operator: Verkehrs-Aktiengesellschaft Nürnberg

Construction
- Structure type: Underground

Other information
- Fare zone: VGN: 100

History
- Opened: 24 September 1988

Services
Preceding station	Nuremberg U-Bahn	Following station
Plärrer towards Röthenbach	U2	Nürnberg Hbf towards Flughafen
Plärrer towards Großreuth bei Schweinau	U3	Nürnberg Hbf towards Nordwestring
Location

Opernhaus station is a Nuremberg U-Bahn station, located on the U2 and U3.
