= Railway stations in Coburg =

Railway stations in Germany

There are six railway stations in the town of Coburg in Bavaria, southern Germany. These include two passenger stations, three halts and one goods station.

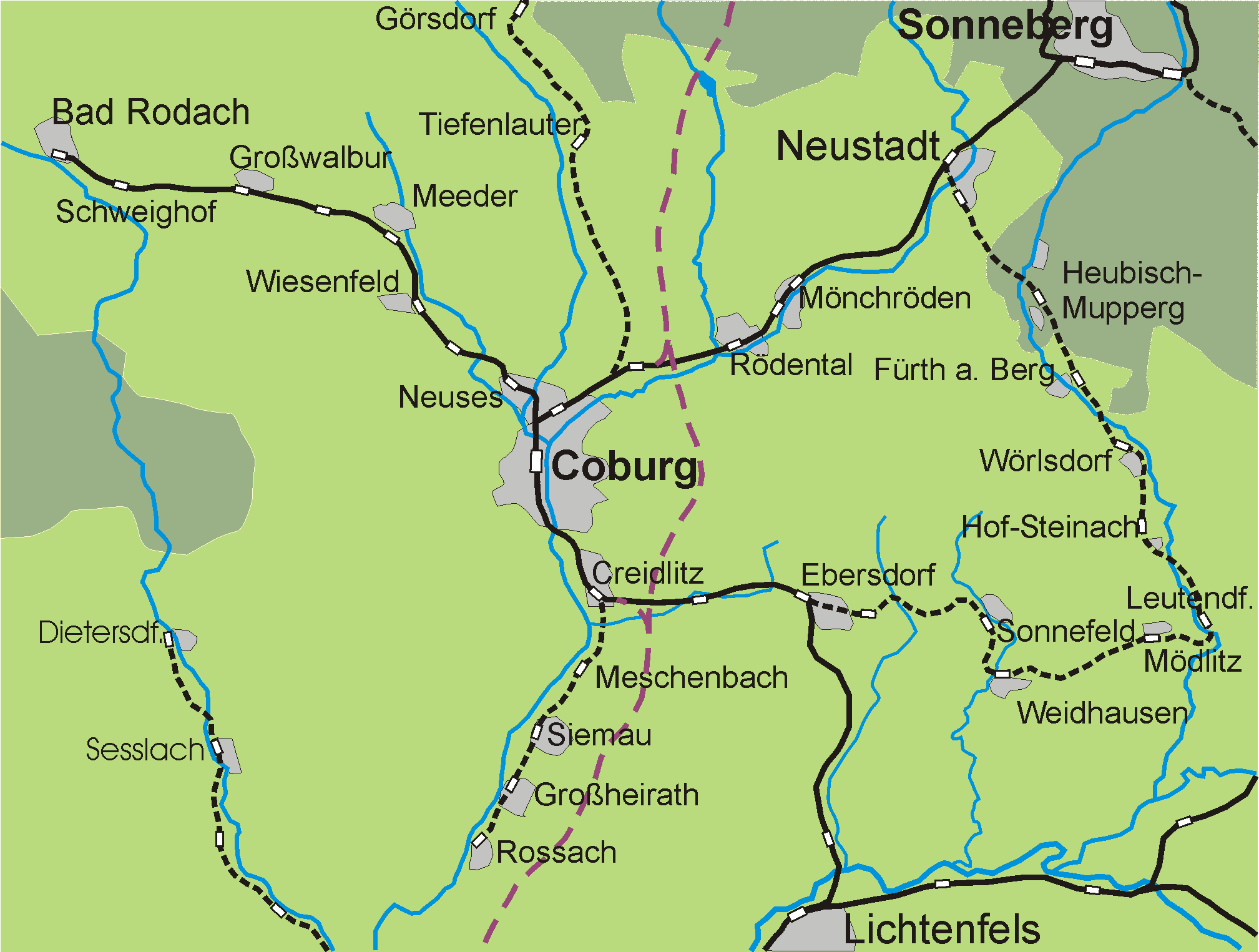
Railway lines to Coburg. Key: Solid black: railways in use Dotted black:closed railways Dashed purple: high-speed line under construction

== Coburg station ==
Coburg station is the most important railway station in the town of Coburg and its surrounding area. From here railway lines run to Bad Rodach, to Sonneberg, to Lichtenfels, Nuremberg and Kulmbach. From 2017, an ICE will call daily at Coburg, briefly leaving the nearby Nuremberg–Erfurt high-speed railway. The station has five tracks a "Service-Center" and several shops in the station building. All Franconia Bus Company (Omnibusverkehr Franken or OVF) lines stop at the station as do all but one of the town bus routes (SÜC). Since 2007 a central bus station has been under construction immediately next to Coburg station. Whilst the station is described simply as a Bahnhof by the railways, the local bus stops and bus timetables usually refer to it as the Hauptbahnhof.

Preceding station	DB Fernverkehr	Following station
Erfurt Hbf towards Berlin Gesundbrunnen	ICE 18	Bamberg towards Nürnberg Hbf
Erfurt Hbf towards Hamburg-Altona	ICE 28	Bamberg towards München Hbf
Erfurt Hbf towards Berlin Gesundbrunnen	ICE 91	Nürnberg Hbf towards Wien Hbf
Preceding station		Following station
Coburg-Neuses towards Bad Rodach	RB 18	Terminus
Terminus	RB 24	Creidlitz towards Bayreuth Hbf
Preceding station	DB Regio Bayern	Following station
Coburg Nord towards Sonneberg (Thür) Hbf	RE 19	Bamberg towards Nürnberg Hbf
Coburg Nord towards Sonneberg (Thür) Hbf	RE 28	Grub am Forst towards Nürnberg Hbf
Coburg Nord towards Erfurt	RE 29	Bamberg towards Nürnberg Hbf
Terminus	RE 32	Ebersdorf towards Nürnberg Hbf

== Creidlitz station ==
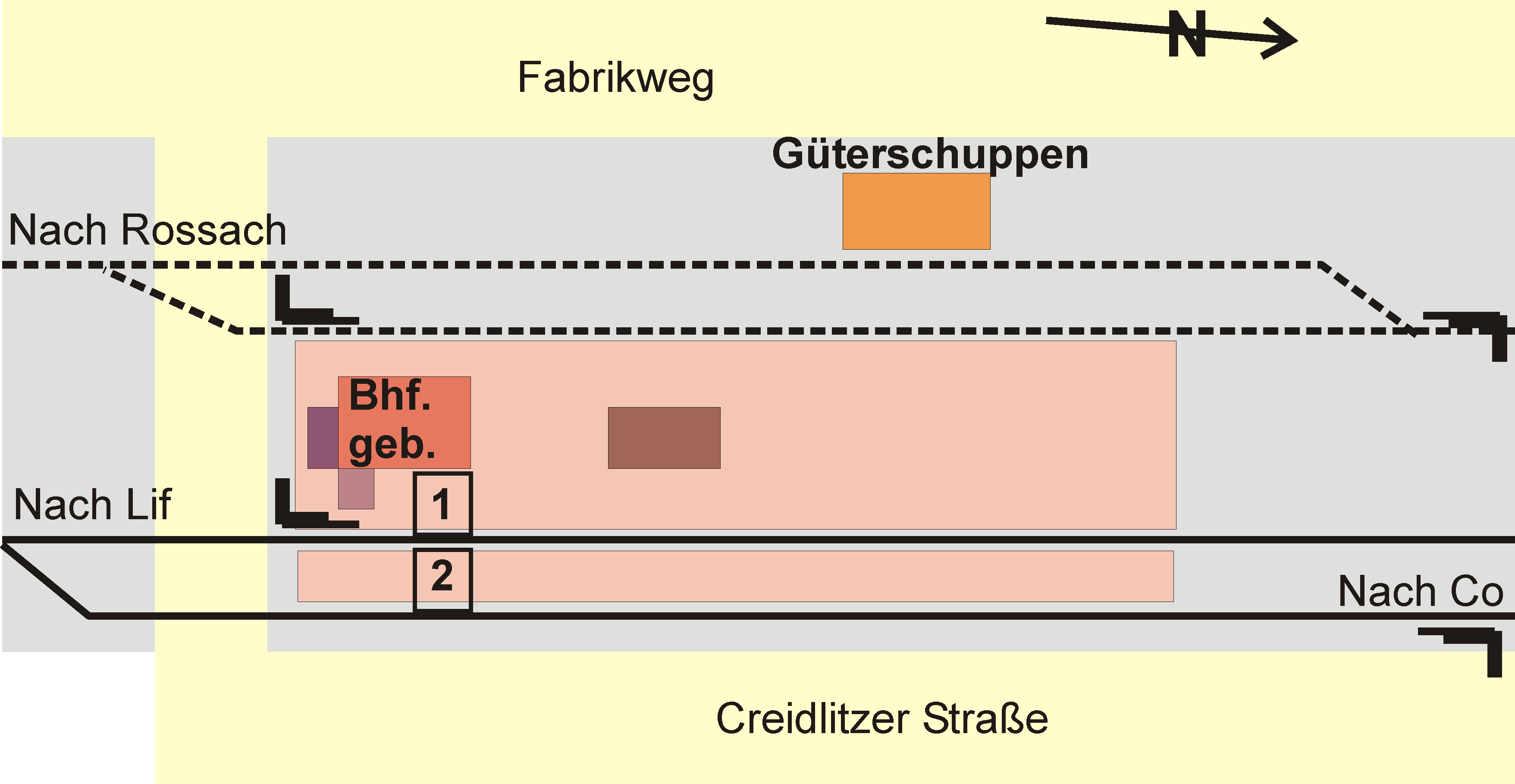
Creidlitz station track plan

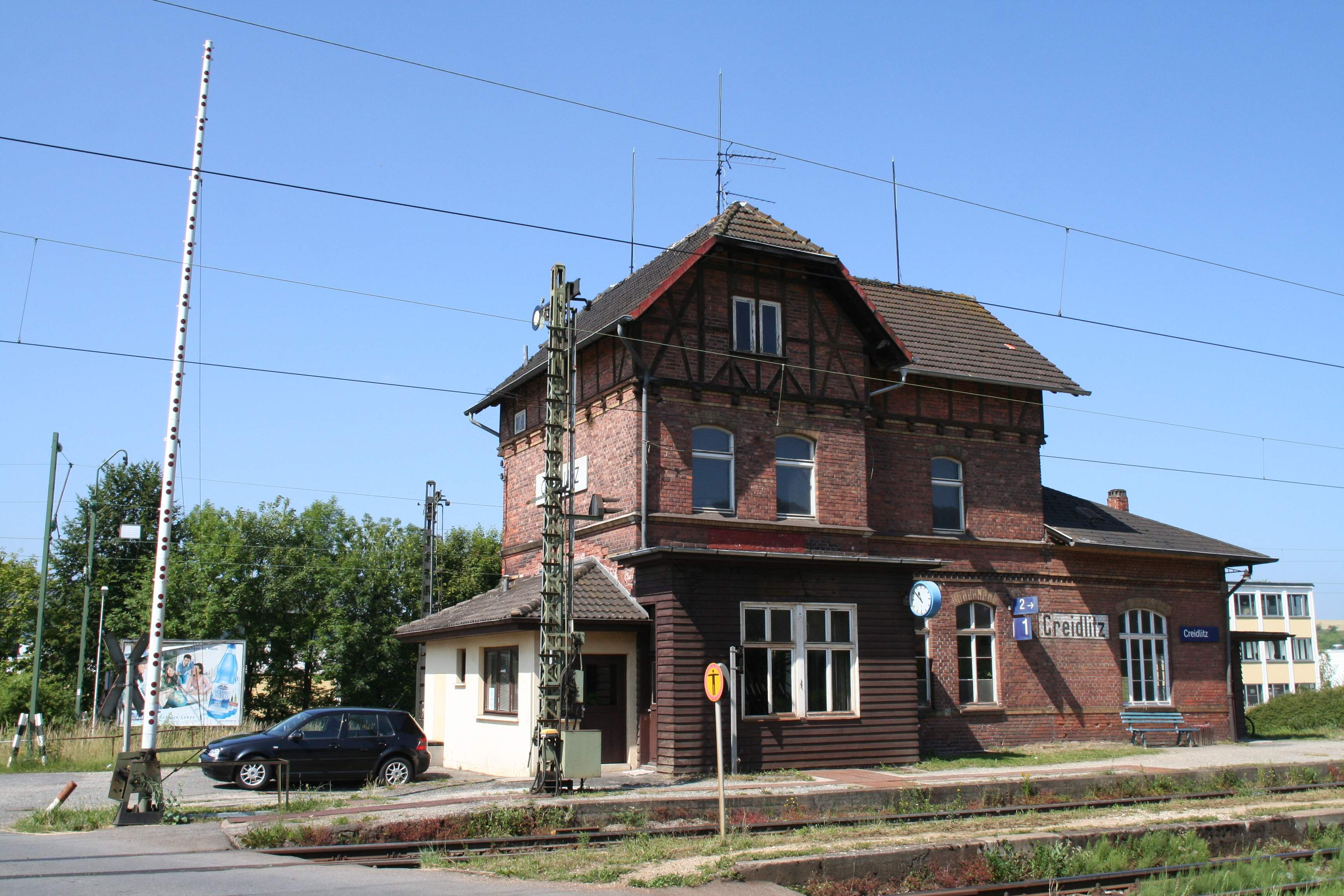
Creidlitz station with the line to Lichtenfels

Creidlitz station is located on the south side of the town of Coburg on the Werra Railway at kilometre stone 134.77 between Coburg station and the halt at Grub am Forst. Despite having two platforms and being described as a Bahnhof, it is not particularly important nowadays, only the Regionalbahn trains to Coburg and those in the opposite direction to Lichtenfels stop here. The trains to Lichtenfels leave from the eastern 'home platform, number 1, and trains to Coburg from platform 2, an island platform with no subway. The red brick station building was built at the end of the 19th century. Due to its age, it is one of the most important station buildings in the Coburg district and is a listed building. During the construction of the Itz Valley Railway to Rossach in 1900 the station, which is located between branching tracks, was built with two platforms in 1911; whene the second line to Coburg was built it was expanded by a further platform. On the eastern side are the two tracks of the Werra railway and on the western side, the Itzgrund railway track and a second, parallel, track for the goods shed. In 1950 the station, including the Rossach branch, was electrified. In 2004 the Rossach branch was closed. Because the section of line to Lichtenfels is single-tracked, trains often cross at the station. In 2008 the station still had semaphore signals and manually operated level crossing barriers. Next to the station is a bus stop with the same name - Creidlitz/Bahnhof - which is served by one of the town bus lines as well as busses of the OVF.

Preceding station		Following station
Coburg Terminus	RB 24	Grub am Forst towards Bayreuth Hbf

== Coburg-Nord halt ==
Coburg-Nord halt lies on the Coburg–Sonneberg line between Coburg station and the halt at Dörfles-Esbach at kilometre stone 1.3. It was built in the trackbed of the old line to Eisfeld and taken into operation on 11 December 2005 together with Rödental-Mitte station. The platform is 140 m long and is located behind the Coburg tax office on Rodacher Strasse.

Preceding station	DB Regio Bayern	Following station
Coburg towards Sonneberg (Thür) Hbf	RE 19	Dörfles-Esbach towards Nürnberg Hbf
Coburg towards Nürnberg Hbf	RE 28	Dörfles-Esbach towards Sonneberg
Coburg towards Erfurt	RE 29	Erfurt Hbf towards Nürnberg Hbf

== Coburg-Neuses halt ==
Coburg-Neuses halt is situated between Coburg station and Wiesenfeld halt at kilometre marker 1.99. The halt was originally a station, but was later downgraded to a halt. The Coburg–Bad Rodach Regionalbahn trains call here every 2 hours. The stop has two tracks, the main running track by the platform and the siding with a branch to the incinerating plant. The station is rather insignificant because there are very good bus connexions to Neuses. Since 1999 the station building has been home to the Steinach Valley Railway Society (Eisenbahnfreunde Steinachtalbahn-Coburg).

Preceding station		Following station
Coburg-Beiersdorf towards Bad Rodach	RB 18	Coburg Terminus

== Coburg-Beiersdorf halt ==
Many years ago there was also a halt at Beiersdorf that was on the line to Bad Rodach. This was closed due to low passenger numbers and competition from good bus services in this part of the town.

Preceding station		Following station
Wiesenfeld (b Coburg) towards Bad Rodach	RB 18	Coburg-Neuses towards Coburg

== Goods station ==
The goods station is south of Coburg station at kilometre post 131.8 on the Werra railway.

== See also ==
- Royal Bavarian State Railways
- List of railway stations in Bavaria
- Coburg goods station

== Sources ==
Wolfgang Bleiweis, Stefan Goldschmidt und Bernd Schmitt: Eisenbahnen im Coburger Land. Resch Druck: Coburg 1996, ISBN 3-9802748-4-5
