= Sonneberg (Thür) Hauptbahnhof =

Railway station in Sonneberg, Germany

Sonneberg (Thür) Hbf
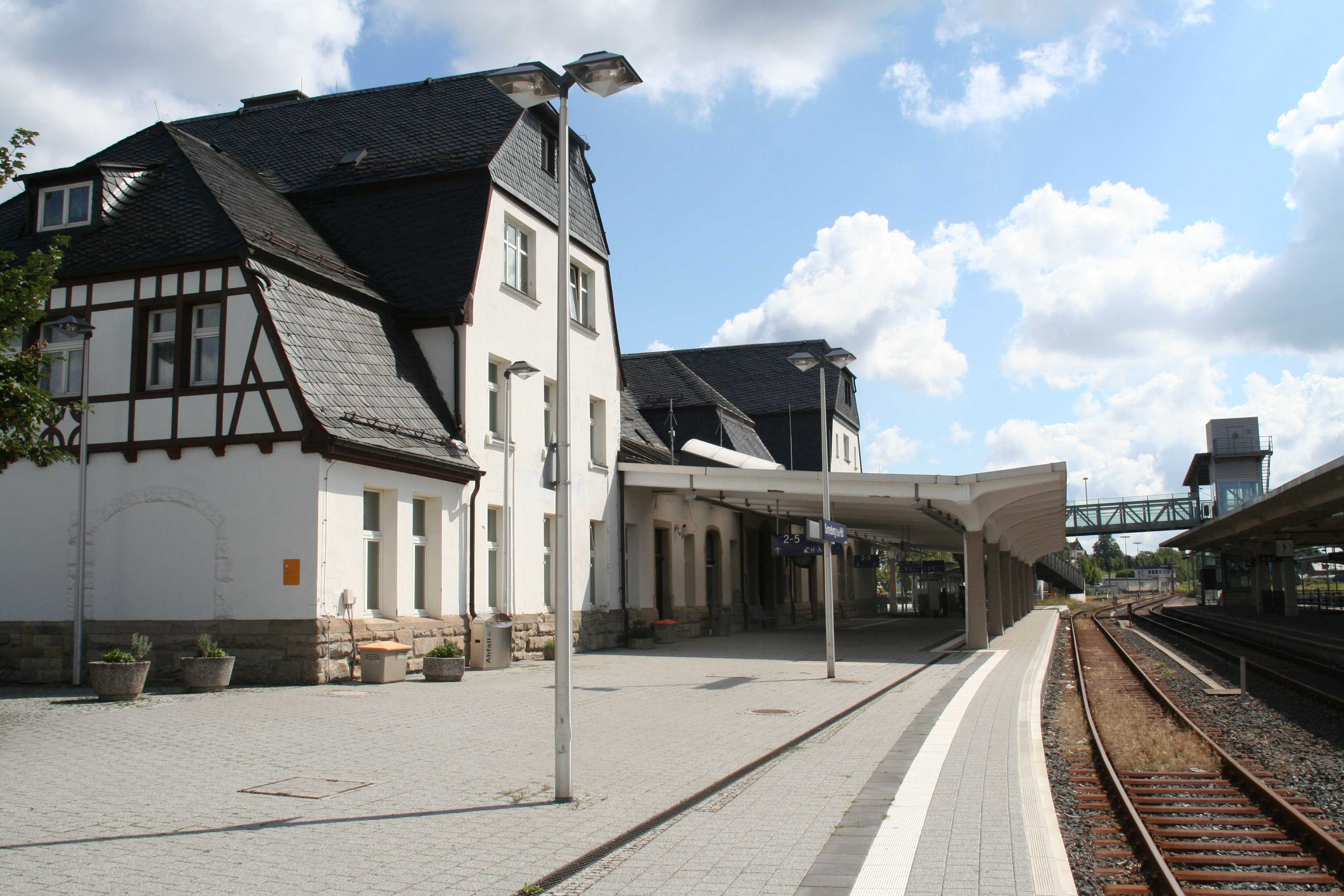
- View of the station

General information
- Location: Bahnhofsplatz 3, Sonneberg, Thuringia; Germany
- Coordinates: 50°21′19″N 11°10′08″E
- Elevation: 387.25 m (1,270.5 ft)
- Owner: DB Netz
- Operator: DB Station&Service
- Lines: Hinterland Railway (KBS 569); Coburg–Sonneberg (KBS 830); Sonneberg–Probstzella (KBS 564); Sonnenberg–Stockheim
- Platforms: 5

Construction
- Accessible: Yes
- Architectural style: Heimatstil

Other information
- Station code: 5904
- DS100 code: USO
- IBNR: 8013008
- Category: 4
- Website: www.bahnhof.de

History
- Opened: 1907

Services
| Preceding station | DB Regio Bayern | Following station |
|---|---|---|
| Terminus | RE 19 | Neustadt (b Coburg) towards Nürnberg Hbf |
| Preceding station | | Following station |
| Sonneberg (Thür) West towards Eisenach | RB 41 | Sonneberg (Thür) Ost towards Neuhaus am Rennweg |
Location
- Location within Thuringia

Sonneberg (Thür) Hauptbahnhof is a railway station for the city of Sonneberg in the German state of Thuringia and is on the Coburg–Sonneberg line. The station was built as part of the construction of the Hinterland Railway and still plays a central role in public transport of Sonneberg and the surrounding area. It was built in 1907 to replace the old station (the old building still exists), which was built in 1857 and 1858 by the Werra Railway Company (German: Werra-Eisenbahn-Gesellschaft), together with the single-track Coburg–Sonneberg line, a branch line of the Werra Railway.

== Location ==
Sonneberg Hauptbahnhof is at the 19.51 km mark of the Coburg–Sonneberg line at a height of 386.41 metres above sea level and is located south of the town centre. To its north the inner ring roads runs parallel with it. The station is the starting point for services to Coburg as well as on the line to Neuhaus am Rennweg and on the Hinterland line to Eisfeld.

== History ==
On 2 November 1858 the first Sonneberg terminal station was officially opened by the Werra Railway Company. 28 years later, on 1 October 1886, it was converted into a through station with the commissioning of the line to Lauscha. However, after the opening of the Sonneberg–Stockheim line on 1 June 1901, the existing railway facilities, which had been taken over by the Prussian state railways in 1895, could no longer handle the growing traffic. Therefore, the railway administration of Erfurt (Reichsbahndirektion Erfurt) started building a new railway station in 1905, southeast of the old station, and opened it two years later in October 1907. The new station building was four times as large as the old building and cost about 2.7 million marks. The platform canopies were built by the Dyckerhoff & Widmann Company and were the first built out of reinforced concrete in Germany.

The Hinterland railway opened on 1 April 1910, making it the fourth line connecting to the station. It had an extensive freight yard with a hump, with 27 tracks and 102 sets of points. It suffered major damage at the end of the Second World War. The German Wehrmacht blew up the signal boxes and an air strike by U.S. fighter-bombers destroyed the storage shed and 70% of the track and points. After the occupation by Thuringia by Soviet troops in July 1945, operations were suspended on the main lines to Coburg and Stockheim. The station lost much of its traffic. Four freight tracks and a platform track were removed to provide reparations for the Soviet Union.

In 1952, the station was renamed as a Hauptbahnhof (main station). In 1971, the two signal boxes were replaced with new buildings and colour light signals were introduced. The goods yard precinct was still the most extensive in South Thuringia, although rail traffic only ran on the two branch lines to Probstzella and Eisfeld and the freight marshalling could be handled in Rauenstein or Lauscha.

After German reunification the line was reactivated to Coburg and tracks 3-6 were electrified. In 1997, services to Probstzella and Eisfeld were abandoned. Between 1997 and 1999 the station was redesigned and a central bus station was established. In addition, a 220 m-long (720 ft) pedestrian bridge was built with lifts to the platforms and the bus station. The freight yard was closed in 1999. The five remaining platform tracks were renovated and a continuous freight track and two freight sidings were installed between 2001 and 2002. In addition, an electronic signal box was installed and Thüringer Eisenbahn GmbH took over operations on the lines to Lauscha and Neuhaus (the Sonneberg–Probstzella line) and to Rauenstein and Eisfeld (the Hinterland line).

== Passenger rail service ==
Over the years there have generally only been simple passenger trains from Sonneberg station. However, in 1937 there was an express train that took about three hours and ten minutes to run the 142 km from Coburg via Sonneberg, Stockheim and Göschwitz to Weimar. Also a pair of trains ran from 1954 and 1970 with interruptions via Saalfeld to Leipzig.

Since 2007, Süd-Thüringen-Bahn has operated its Line 1 every two hours to Meiningen and its Line 4 every hour to Neuhaus am Rennweg. Deutsche Bahn's RE 30 service connects Sonneberg hourly via Coburg and Bamberg to Nuremberg.
