= Nürnberg Hauptbahnhof =

Railway station in Nuremberg, Germany

Nürnberg Hbf
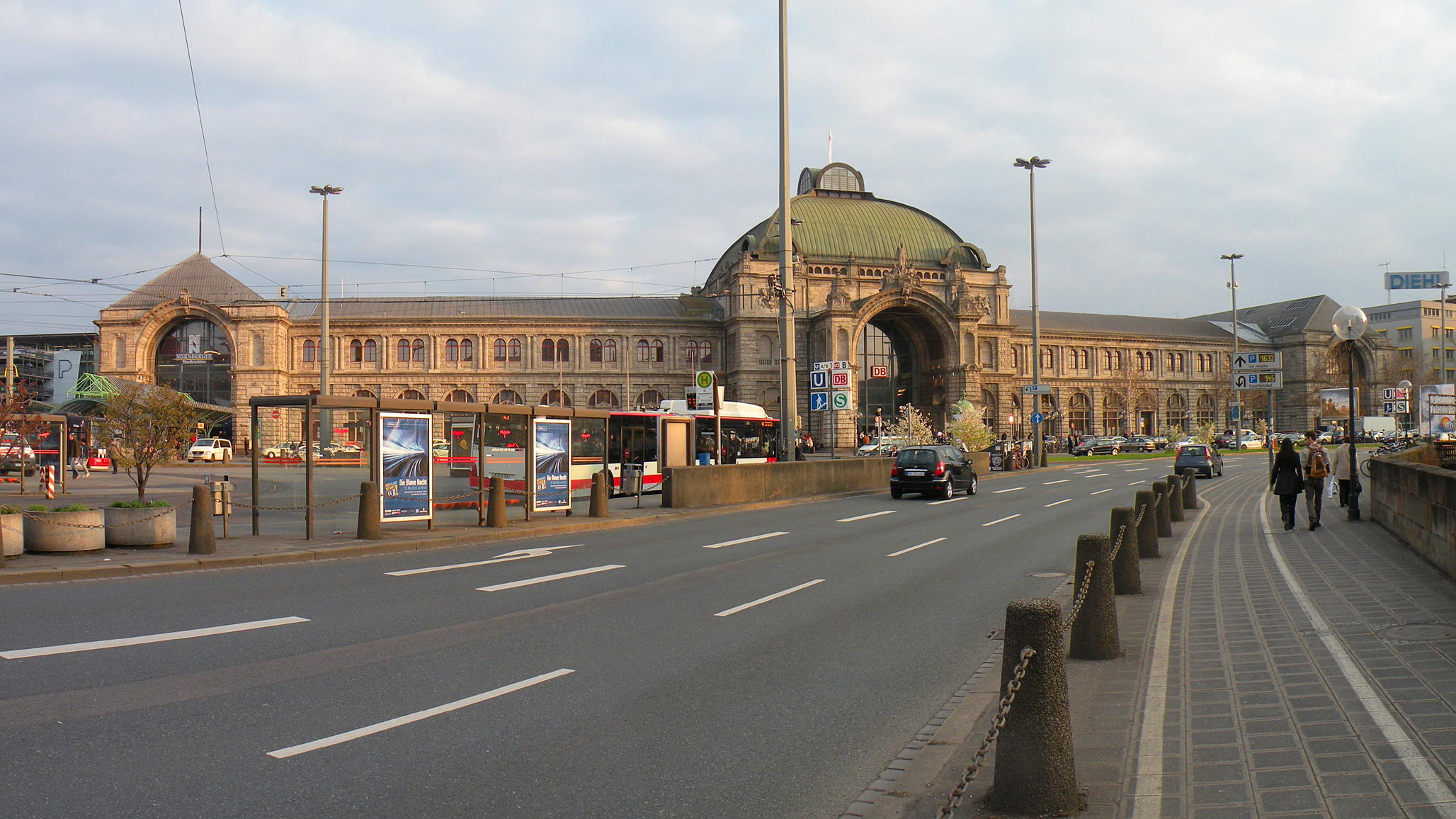
- The station building

General information
- Location: Nuremberg, Bavaria; Germany
- Coordinates: 49°26′47″N 11°04′55″E
- Owner: Deutsche Bahn
- Operator: DB InfraGO
- Lines: Nuremberg–Augsburg (KBS 910, 970.1); Nuremberg–Bamberg (KBS 820, 891.2); Nuremberg–Cheb (KBS 512, 544, 860, 891.3); Nuremberg–Crailsheim (KBS 786, 891.7); Nuremberg–Feucht (KBS 890.2); Nuremberg–Ingolstadt–Munich (KBS 900, 901, 990); Nuremberg–Regensburg (KBS 880); Nuremberg–Roth (KBS 890.3); Nuremberg–Schwandorf (KBS 870, 890.1); Nuremberg–Würzburg (KBS 805, 811, 891.1, 900)
- Platforms: 22
- Connections: U-Bahn: Hardhöhe – Langwasser Süd; Flughafen – Röthenbach; Nordwestring – Gustav-Adolf-Straße; Tram: Tiergarten – Worzeldorfer Straße; (Bayernstraße) – Tristanstraße – Erlenstegen; Doku-Zentrum – Hauptbahnhof; Bus: Hauptbahnhof - Heinemannbrücke; Hauptbahnhof - Zerzabelshof Ost; Nürnberg - Ittling

Construction
- Accessible: Yes
- Architectural style: Neo-Baroque; Neo-Renaissance (front façade); Jugendstil (travel centre)

Other information
- Station code: 4593
- DS100 code: NN
- Category: 1
- Fare zone: VGN: 100
- Website: www.bahnhof.de; BEG's station fact file

History
- Opened: 1 October 1844; 181 years ago
- Electrified: 10 May 1935; 91 years ago

Passengers
- 200,000 daily
Services
Preceding station	DB Fernverkehr	Following station
Würzburg Hbf towards Hamburg-Altona	ICE 1 Sprinter	Regensburg Hbf towards Passau Hbf
Berlin Südkreuz towards Berlin Gesundbrunnen	ICE 6 Sprinter	Reverses direction
Stuttgart Hbf Terminus	ICE 6 Sprinter	Reverses direction
Erlangen towards Berlin Gesundbrunnen or Hamburg-Altona	ICE 18	Reverses direction
Treuchtlingen towards München Hbf	ICE 18	Reverses direction
Würzburg Hbf towards Hamburg-Altona	ICE 25	Ingolstadt Hbf towards München Hbf
Erlangen towards Hamburg-Altona	ICE 28	Ingolstadt Hbf towards München Hbf
Erfurt Hbf towards Berlin Hbf	ICE 29 Sprinter	München Hbf Terminus
Würzburg Hbf towards Dortmund Hbf	ICE 41	München Hbf Terminus
Würzburg Hbf towards Hamburg-Altona or Dortmund Hbf	ICE 91	Regensburg Hbf towards Wien Hbf
Coburg towards Berlin Gesundbrunnen	ICE 91	Regensburg Hbf towards Wien Hbf
Ansbach towards Karlsruhe Hbf	IC 61	Erlangen towards Leipzig Hbf
Preceding station	ÖBB	Following station
Würzburg Hbf towards Amsterdam Centraal or Hamburg-Altona	Nightjet	Regensburg Hbf towards Wien Hbf
Würzburg Hbf towards Amsterdam Centraal or Hamburg-Altona	Nightjet	Reverses direction
Augsburg Hbf towards Innsbruck Hbf	Nightjet	Reverses direction
Preceding station	DB Regio Bayern	Following station
Terminus	RE 1	Allersberg (Rothsee) towards München Hbf
Treuchtlingen towards Lindau-Insel	RE 7	Terminus
Fürth Hbf towards Würzburg Hbf	RE 10	Terminus
Fürth Hbf towards Saalfeld (Saale)	RE 14	Terminus
Schwabach towards Augsburg Hbf	RE 16	Terminus
Treuchtlingen towards Oberstdorf	RE 17	Terminus
Fürth Hbf towards Sonneberg (Thür) Hbf	RE 19	Terminus
Fürth Hbf towards Würzburg Hbf	RE 20	Terminus
Fürth Hbf towards Sonneberg (Thür) Hbf	RE 28	Terminus
Fürth Hbf towards Erfurt Hbf	RE 29	Terminus
Terminus	RE 30	Neuhaus (Pegnitz) towards Hof Hbf
Terminus	RE 31	Neuhaus (Pegnitz) towards Hof Hbf
Terminus	RE 32	Hersbruck (r Pegnitz) towards Bamberg
Terminus	RE 33	Neuhaus (Pegnitz) towards Cheb
Terminus	RE 38	Hersbruck (r Pegnitz) towards Bamberg
Terminus	RE 40	Hersbruck (r Pegnitz) towards Regensburg Hbf
Terminus	RE 41	Hersbruck (r Pegnitz) towards Neustadt (Waldnaab)
Terminus	RE 43	Hersbruck (r Pegnitz) towards Regensburg Hbf
Terminus	RE 47	Hersbruck (r Pegnitz) towards Furth im Wald
Schwabach towards Treuchtlingen	RE 60	Terminus
Schwabach towards München Hbf	RB 16	Terminus
Terminus	RB 30	Nürnberg Ost towards Neuhaus (Pegnitz)
Terminus	RB 31	Nürnberg Ost towards Simmelsdorf-Hüttenbach
Preceding station		Following station
Roßtal towards Stuttgart Hbf	RE 90	Terminus
Preceding station	Agilis / DB Regio Bayern	Following station
Terminus	RE 22	Neumarkt (Oberpfalz) towards Munich Airport
Preceding station		Following station
Terminus	RE 50	Neumarkt (Oberpfalz) towards Plattling
Preceding station	Nuremberg S-Bahn	Following station
Steinbühl towards Bamberg	S1	Feucht towards Neumarkt (Oberpfalz)
Steinbühl towards Roth	S2	Dürrenhof towards Hartmannshof
Terminus	S3	Dürrenhof towards Altdorf
Schweinau towards Crailsheim	S4	Terminus
Terminus	S5	Allersberg (Rothsee) Terminus
Fürth Hbf towards Neustadt (Aisch)	S6	Terminus
Preceding station	Nuremberg U-Bahn	Following station
Lorenzkirche towards Fürth Hardhöhe	U1	Aufseßplatz towards Langwasser Süd
Opernhaus towards Röthenbach	U2	Wöhrder Wiese towards Flughafen
Opernhaus towards Großreuth bei Schweinau	U3	Wöhrder Wiese towards Nordwestring
Location

Nürnberg Hauptbahnhof (German for Nuremberg Central Station) is the main railway station serving the city of Nuremberg in Germany. It is the largest station in Franconia and belongs to the 20 stations in the highest category of importance allocated by DB Station&Service.

It is a through station with 22 platforms and lies on major north–south and east–west transportation axes. It offers connections to the major German cities of Leipzig, Berlin, Augsburg, Ingolstadt, Munich, Würzburg, Frankfurt and Regensburg, as well as Linz and Vienna in Austria and Prague in the Czech Republic. Over 450 trains stop here daily and more than 200,000 passengers use the station on average every day. It is also a major hub for public transport in Nuremberg.

The Hauptbahnhof is located on the southeastern perimeter of Nuremberg's Altstadt, immediately opposite the Königstor (King's Gate) where the streets of Marientorgraben, Frauentorgraben, and Bahnhofstraße meet. The DB Museum, the corporate museum of Deutsche Bahn (formerly the Verkehrsmuseum), is close to the station, as is the Staatstheater Nürnberg opera house.

== Location in the railway network ==
Nürnberg Hauptbahnhof is an important hub in the south German railway network. Numerous lines meet here from all points of the compass. Amongst them is the Nuremberg–Ingolstadt high-speed railway, opened in summer 2006 and which shortened journey times on many routes. The Hauptbahnhof is also the departure point for the Nuremberg–Erfurt high-speed line, opened in December 2017.

West of another Hauptbahnhof in neighbouring Fürth the lines from Würzburg and Bamberg merge and then continue towards Nuremberg. In west Nuremberg they are joined by the railways from Crailsheim, Roth and Augsburg. The four lines then enter together at the western approach to the station.

In southeast Nuremberg the line from Regensburg and the high-speed link from Munich meet one another. At the eastern approach to the station they join the lines from Cheb, Feucht and Schwandorf. They arrive together at the eastern end of the station.

== Railway services ==
=== Long-distance services ===
The Hauptbahnhof is located at the intersection of various Intercity-Express, InterCity and EuroCity routes and is the only long-distance station in Nuremberg. These routes generally run to Nuremberg hourly, although some are more frequent as a result of overlapping services.

Long-distance trains travel from here to Munich, Leipzig, Berlin, into the Rhine-Main and the Ruhrgebiet; to Stuttgart, Karlsruhe, Bremen and Hamburg as well as Passau and Vienna. An Interregio-Express link runs to Chemnitz and Dresden. Night trains travel to various destinations including the Brussels, Innsbruck, Vienna, Hamburg and Düsseldorf.

In the 2026 timetable, the following long-distance services stop at the station:

Line	Route	Interval	Stock
ICE 1	Hamburg-Altona – Hamburg – Essen – Duisburg – Düsseldorf – Cologne – Bonn – Koblenz – Mainz – Frankfurt Airport – Frankfurt – Würzburg – Nuremberg – Regensburg – Passau	Two train pairs	
ICE 6	Berlin Gesundbrunnen – Berlin – Berlin Südkreuz – Nuremberg – Stuttgart	One train pair	
ICE 18	Hamburg-Altona – Hamburg – Berlin – Halle – Erfurt – Nuremberg – Augsburg – Munich	Every 2 hours	ICE 1
ICE 25	Munich – Ingolstadt – Nuremberg – Würzburg – Fulda – Kassel-Wilhelmshöhe – Göttingen – Hannover – Hamburg Harburg – Hamburg – Hamburg Dammtor – Hamburg-Altona	Hourly	ICE 1, ICE 2, ICE T, ICE 4
ICE 28	Munich – München-Pasing – Augsburg – Donauwörth – Nuremberg – Erlangen – Bamberg (– Coburg –) Erfurt – Leipzig – Lutherstadt Wittenberg – Berlin Südkreuz – Berlin – Hamburg – Hamburg-Altona	Every 2 hours	ICE T
ICE 29	Munich – Nuremberg – Erfurt – Halle – Berlin Südkreuz – Berlin – Berlin Gesundbrunnen (– Hamburg Hbf – Hamburg-Altona)	Every 2 hours	ICE 3
ICE 41	Munich – Nuremberg – Würzburg – Aschaffenburg – Frankfurt (Main) – Frankfurt Airport – Köln Messe/Deutz – Düsseldorf – Duisburg – Essen – Bochum – Dortmund	Hourly	ICE 3
IC 61	Leipzig – Naumburg (Saale) Hbf – Jena Paradies – Saalfeld (Saale) – Kronach – Lichtenfels – Bamberg – Nuremberg – Ansbach – Crailsheim – Ellwangen – Aalen – Schwäbisch Gmünd – Stuttgart – Vaihingen (Enz) – Pforzheim – Mühlacker – Karlsruhe	Every 2 hours	Intercity 2
ICE 91	Vienna – Wien Meidling – St. Pölten – Linz – Passau – Plattling – Regensburg – Nuremberg – Würzburg – Hanau – Frankfurt (Main) (– Frankfurt Airport – Mainz – Koblenz – Bonn – Cologne – Solingen – Wuppertal – Hagen – Dortmund – Münster (Westf) – Osnabrück – Bremen – Hamburg)	Every 2 hours	ICE T

=== Local services ===
Local services using Regional-Express and Regionalbahn trains mainly serve the Nuremberg area, but also travel to other parts of Bavaria as well as Baden-Württemberg, Thuringia and into the Czech Republic to Prague. Almost all lines are run at fixed frequencies, mainly hourly. More frequent services are laid on especially at peak times. The Munich-Nuremberg Express provides a fast local service between the two cities over the high-speed link to Ingolstadt and Munich, offering a cheaper alternative to the ICE.

Two of the four S-Bahn lines also start from the Hauptbahnhof. The S-Bahn uses platforms 2 and 3 immediately next to the station building which significantly reduces changeover times to the city's public transport systems.

In the 2026 timetable, the following regional services stop at the station:

Line	Route	Frequency
RE 1	Nuremberg – Allersberg (Rothsee) – Ingolstadt – Petershausen – Munich	Hourly(+ extra peak services)
RE 7	(Nuremberg – Treuchtlingen –) Augsburg – Buchloe – Kempten – Immenstadt – Lindau-Reutin	2 train pairs
RE 10	Nuremberg – Fürth – Neustadt – Kitzingen – Würzburg	Hourly
RB 11	(Nuremberg –) Fürth – Zirndorf – Cadolzburg	1 train pair (Mon–Fri)
RB 12	(Nuremberg –) Fürth – Siegelsdorf – Markt Erlbach	Some trains
RE 14	Nuremberg – Fürth – Erlangen – Bamberg – Lichtenfels – Kronach – Saalfeld	Every 2 hours
RE 16	Nuremberg – Roth – Treuchtlingen – Donauwörth – Augsburg	Every 2 hours
RB 16	Nuremberg – Roth – Treuchtlingen – Ingolstadt – Pfaffenhofen (Ilm) – Petershausen – Dachau – Munich	Every 2 hours
RB 17	(Nuremberg – Treuchtlingen –) Augsburg – Buchloe – Kempten – Immenstadt – Oberstdorf	2 train pairs
RE 19	Nuremberg – Fürth – Erlangen – Bamberg – Coburg – Sonneberg	Every 2 hours
RE 20	Nuremberg – Fürth – Erlangen – Bamberg – Schweinfurt – Würzburg	Every 2 hours
RE 30	Nuremberg – Neuhaus – Pegnitz – Bayreuth – Hof	Hourly to Bayreuth; Hourly to Hof
RB 30	Nuremberg – Lauf – Neunkirchen a Sand – Hersbruck – Neuhaus	Hourly (+ extra peak services)
RE 31	Nuremberg – Neuhaus – Pegnitz – Marktredwitz – Hof	Hourly
RB 31	Nuremberg – Lauf – Neunkirchen a Sand – Hüttenbach	Hourly (Mo–Fr)
RE 32	Nuremberg – Hersbruck – Pegnitz – Bayreuth – Neuenmarkt-Wirsberg – Lichtenfels – Bamberg	Hourly to Bayreuth (Mon–Fri); Hourly to Bamberg
RE 33	Nuremberg – Neuhaus – Pegnitz – Marktredwitz – Cheb	Every 2 hours
RE 40	Nuremberg – Hersbruck – Hartmannshof – Neukirchen – Amberg – Schwandorf – Regensburg	Hourly (+ extra peak services)
RE 41	Nuremberg – Hersbruck – Hartmannshof – Neukirchen – Weiden – Neustadt	Hourly
RE 47	Nuremberg – Hersbruck – Hartmannshof – Neukirchen – Amberg – Schwandorf – Furth i Wald	2 train pairs
RE 49	Nuremberg – Fürth – Erlangen – Bamberg – Lichtenfels – Coburg – Sonneberg	Every 2 hours
RE 50	Nuremberg – Neumarkt – Regensburg – Landshut – Munich	Hourly (1 train pair to Passau (Sat/Sun))
RE 60	Nuremberg – Roth – Treuchtlingen	Hourly (Mon–Fri)
RE 90	Nuremberg – Ansbach – Crailsheim – Schwäbisch Hall-Hessental – Stuttgart	Every 2 hours
As of 12 December 2021

=== City services ===
Below the station is the Hauptbahnhof's underground station on the Nuremberg U-Bahn, one of the two crossing stations on the U1, U2 and U3 underground lines. The U1 line goes to the Nuremberg Messe (exhibition hall) amongst others, line U2 links the Hauptbahnhof with Nuremberg Nordost station, the departure point for the Gräfenberg Railway to Franconian Switzerland and Nuremberg Airport. The subway stop is equipped with orange tiles on the walls, intended as signifying an important interchange station. Similar orange tiles were also used at Aufseßplatz (U1 and Tram), Plärrer (all subway lines and several tram lines) and Friedrich Ebert Platz (U3 and Tram). On the station square are stops for the various city tram and bus lines. At weekends and on public holidays the station square is the meeting place and central changeover hub for the NightLiner night bus line network. East of that, about 200 m away, is the central bus station, reopened in 2005 after being rebuilt. From here there are also international bus services to various European countries.

== Infrastructure ==
=== Facilities ===
Because of its importance for long-distance and local services the station has a comprehensive range of facilities.

Deutsche Bahn has a travel centre and Servicepoint in the central hall (Mittelhalle). On the first floor is a DB lounge for bahn.comfort and 1st class passengers. Numerous electronic signboards in the halls and on the platforms inform passengers about the latest traffic situation, and recorded announcements are played automatically. Most of the station building and platforms have step-free access. All floors of the station building can be reached by escalators and lifts. The Bahnhofsmission at Nuremberg Hauptbahnhof is like a free first aid and support centre run by Christian charities and is located in the basement of the station ready to give advice and support to passengers, the homeless and those working at the station. On Christmas Eve and Maundy Thursday a service with live music is held in the central hall on the 1st floor.

Numerous businesses for everyday requirements occupy about 20,000 square metres of floor in the station building; these include shops selling travel items, restaurants and fast-food outlets. A total of 55 shops are rented out. More shops and businesses are located in the Königstor passage adjoining the station.

At the beginning of 1999 a multi-storey car park was opened next to the east hall (Osthalle) with 487 bays. Deutsche Bahn initiated the planning, an insurance company provided the necessary investment.

In the Osthalle there is a service point for the InterCity courier service (IC-Kurierdienst) and a luggage locker room with 766 lockers. On the station forecourt there is a taxicab stand.

=== Signal box ===
At the end of November 1988 a new central signal box went into service at Nürnberg Hauptbahnhof. At each end of the station there is a train dispatcher (Fahrdienstleiter) and assistant (Fahrdiensthelfer) to control the western and eastern approaches, supported by a train monitor (Zugmelder), a train announcer (Zugansager) and a pointsman (Wärter) for the adjoining coach works. Its area of operations extends as far as Fürth and the station at Schweinau to the west, to Eibach station to the south and the stations of Dutzendteich and Mögeldorf to the east. In all, 38.3 million deutschmarks were invested. 800 train movements and 2,900 shunting movements are handled per day in the Hauptbahnhof area. Planning began in the 1970s, not just for rationalisation, but also to set out the requirements for the planned high-speed railway to Munich. Shortly before the signal box was opened, a new, million deutschmark, departure board went into service in the Mittelhalle, that was controlled by the new signal box using computers. The new signal box replaced ten old ones that were about 70 years old; three more followed suit as part of the S-Bahn extension in the early 1990s. After the removal of these unfavourably sited, old signal boxes, which were not capable of expansion, five groups of storage sidings could be merged into one.

Around 1900, 116 railwaymen per shift worked the points and signals for about one hundred trains on the spot. In 1913, 122 trains stopped here daily, there were 40 workers per shift controlling the station from 14 signal boxes.

== Architecture ==
Nürnberg Hauptbahnhof, which had been originally built as in the neo-Gothic style, was rebuilt by the architect, Karl Zenger, in 1900 largely in the Neo-Baroque style. The most striking feature is the muschelkalk which characterises the exterior façade. The portals to the individual halls are richly decorated and primarily depict symbols of technological progress, for example a winged wheel above the portal in the Mittelhalle. The lounge, in which the present-day travel centre is located, was built in 1904/1905 by Bruno Paul in the Jugendstil. Sections of the walls are decorated with fine mosaics, the roof is ornamented with unobtrusive stucco. The Jugendstil lounge is one of the few areas of the station, which has survived the destruction of the Second World War. Above the main portal is an advertising column from the early 20th century.

In 1950 plans were made to change the neobaroque style to a neogothic style. Shortly before work began, however, it was stopped, so that only a few areas were changed.

== History ==
=== From opening to the first rebuilding ===
Between 1844 and 1847 Nürnberg Hauptbahnhof appeared in its present location during the construction of the state-owned Ludwig South-North Railway from Lindau to Hof. Because the area at Plärrer, the site of the station belonging to the privately owned Ludwigsbahn to Fürth, was not big enough, the state railway decided to build its own station in front of the Frauentorgraben. It was laid out as a terminal, something which was usual for the larger stations of that time. The station building was built in a neogothic style. With the opening of the state railway lines to Schwabach (1849) Ansbach, (1875) and Bayreuth (1877) as well as the Ostbahn lines to Hersbruck (1859) and Regensburg (1871) the station became the central station for Nuremberg. The Ostbahn company built its own terminus in 1859 during the construction of the line to Hersbruck, east of the existing one, which was linked in 1876 with the western one by a through station.

Rising demand for railway traffic during the 1880s and the ever-growing number of tracks made the construction of the subways, which are still there today, necessary. Gradually the various underpasses - the Tafelfeld, Karl-Bröger, Marien and Dürrenhof tunnels as well as the Celtis and Allersberg subways were built. Between 1878 and 1880 the trackage for passenger traffic was again expanded and in 1880 goods traffic moved to the newly built Nürnberg Hauptgüterbahnhof (main goods station) at Kohlenhof. As early as 1897 new plans for the conversion of the Hauptbahnhof were proposed, which included rebuilding the station building, raising the entire track system by about 3.27 m and building pedestrian underpasses (the West and Ost tunnels) under the tracks. Building work began on 19 April 1900 and was finished on 10 March 1906, the Westtunnel and the southern exit was not completed until 1927, however.

=== Destruction and rebuilding ===
As a result of allied bombing at the end of the Second World War the station building, with the exception of the Jugendstil lounge suffered heavily and on 16 March 1945 had to be closed for nine years. Its reconstruction took place between 1945 and 1956 and had to be simplified due to a lack of money. One new feature was the inclusion of a cinema. In 1973 work began on an underground (U-Bahn) station underneath the Hauptbahnhof. This required the Mittelhalle to be dug out and stood on stilts. Between 1976 and 1984 new platform roofing was installed and platforms 1 to 15 raised to 76 cm above the rail tops. The rebuilding of the third dome and the Mittelhalle was started in 1977. On 2 April 1984 the restaurant established in 1906 was opened again. It covers an area of 390 m^{2}, and is eight metres high. Finally plans were even proposed for a total rebuilding, but these did not come to fruition.

=== Rebuilding of the eastern approach for the S-Bahn ===
In summer 1988 major building work began to construct the main route of the Nuremberg S-Bahn in the area of the Hauptbahnhof. By building its own S-Bahn platforms in the northeast part of the Hauptbahnhof the S-Bahn stop could be moved from platforms 18/19 (on the far side from the city) to platforms 2/3. By using these platforms closer to the city the distance passengers had to walk between tramway, U-Bahn and Bus was significantly reduced. In addition the new S-Bahn station of Nuremberg-Dürrenhof was built.

The rebuilding of the eastern track system, carried out in eight stages, cost around 100 million D-Marks and was paid for by the Government, the state of Bavaria and the city of Nuremberg. Amongst other things, 16 kilometres of track and 60 points covering an area of 156,000 square metres were relaid, and two new fans of storage sidings (totalling 5.7 km) controlled by a shunting signal box were built. To enable the line to Lauf to cross the line to Altdorf without a track crossing being required, a 60-metre-long (200 ft) bridge crossing was built. In all ten bridges had to be altered or replaced and 640 m of sound-damping walls were erected. The only examples in Europe of the wild flower, Astragalus arenarius, a plant related to the milk vetch, along with other groups of plants was transferred to a temporary nursery and later to areas around the railway. The conversion of the area with the platforms cost another 40 million D-Marks.

=== Modernisation at the turn of the millennium ===
At the end of the 20th century the last major changes took place. The cinema was removed and the entire interior reworked. The intermediate floors of the station building were opened to the public and the whole area turned into a shopping mall. Ticket purchase and information was moved to the historic Jugendstil lounge. Three wall mosaics were made by the artist, Iris Rauh. The mosaic Zeitreise ("time journey"), which portrays the subject of travel during the course of time, became nationally noted. On 24 June 2002 the opening ceremony of the station building, now placed under historical building protection, took place.

== Planning ==
As a result of the expansion of the Nuremberg S-Bahn network in the period to 2010, work needs to be carried out on the existing S-Bahn platforms and new ones need to be built. The eastern end of the home platform (no. 1) of the future S-Bahn to Neumarkt (S3) is being lengthened; it will then have 213 m of usable length and a new height of 76 cm above the rail tops. An extra exit to the Osttunnel is also being constructed. For through services on the Hartmannshof – Nuremberg – Forchheim (S1) line, platforms 2 and 3 are being partially lowered to 76 cm and linked by a ramp to the unchanged 96 cm high existing structure. The platform intended for the S-Bahn to Ansbach (S4), number 11 (tracks 22 and 23) will be raised from its present height of 38 cm to 76 cm; at the same time stairs and a lift will be provided and a new platform roof.

== Operational usage ==
The station's footprint is rather large, numbered passenger tracks reach as far as 22. The station serves the entire Nuremberg U-Bahn network, as all three lines interchange at the station together with the U3 which opened in 2008. A tram stop is situated in front of the station.

== Gallery ==
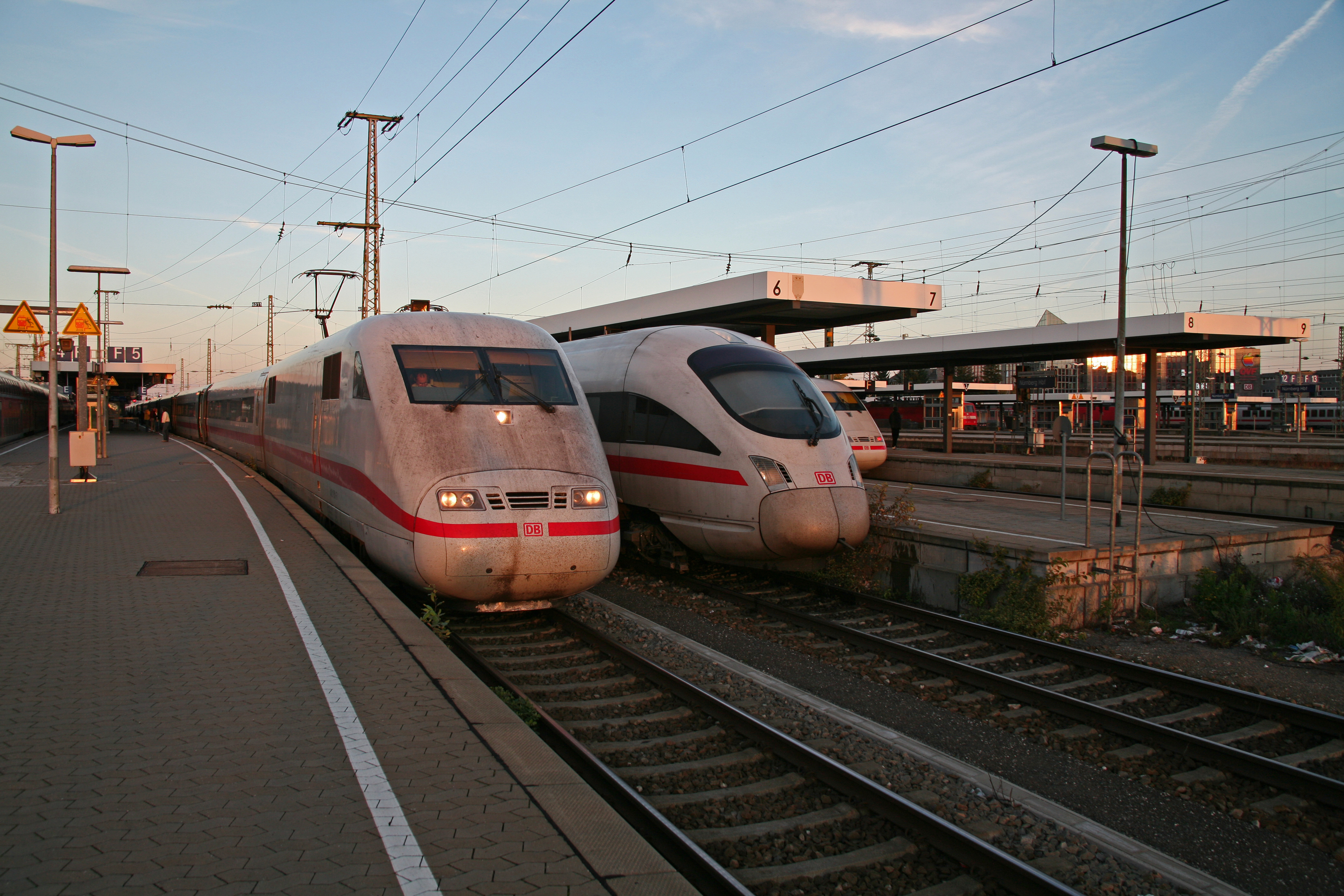
3 ICE-Trains on platform 5, 6 and 7

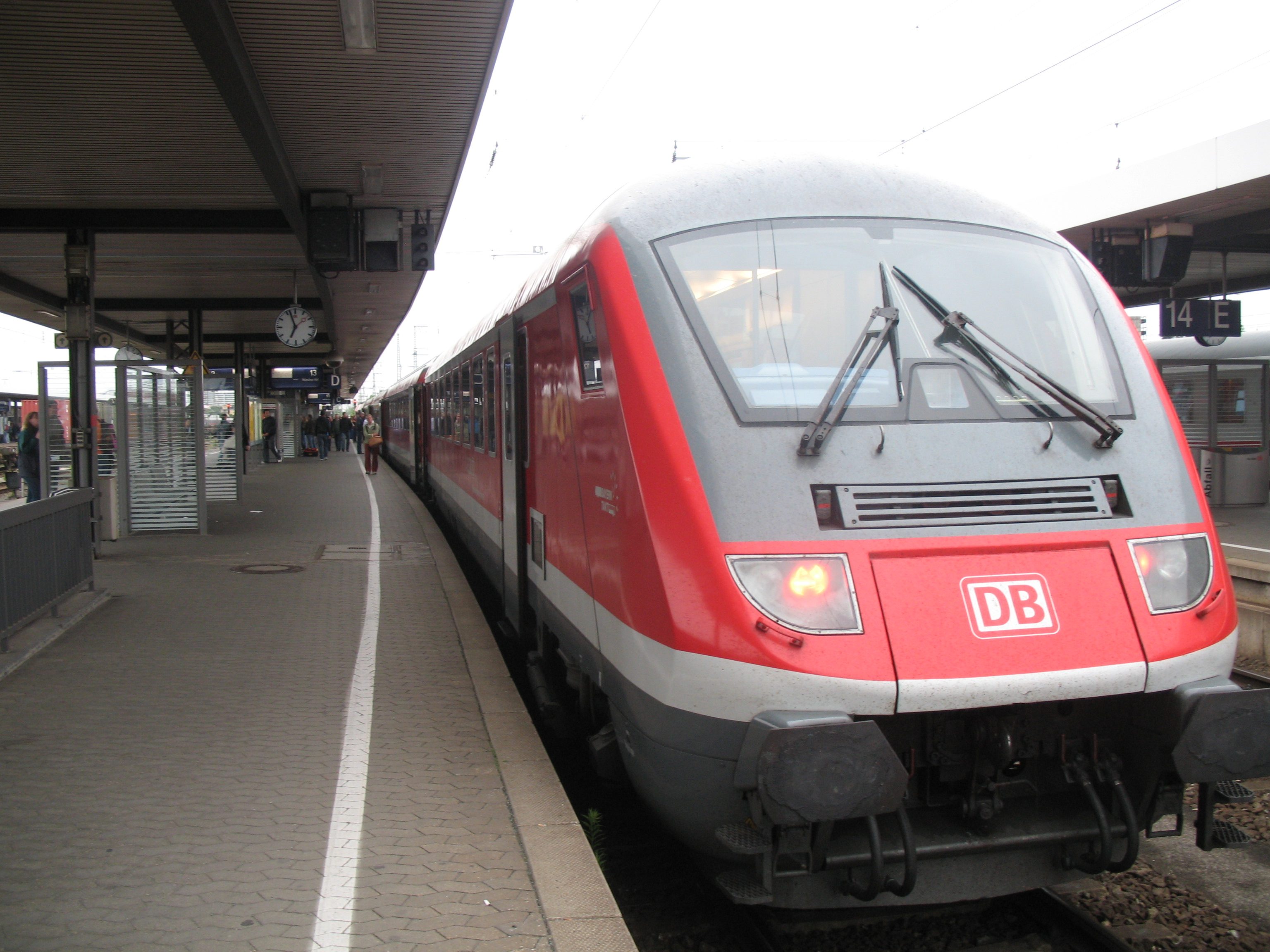
Train "München-Nürnberg-Express"

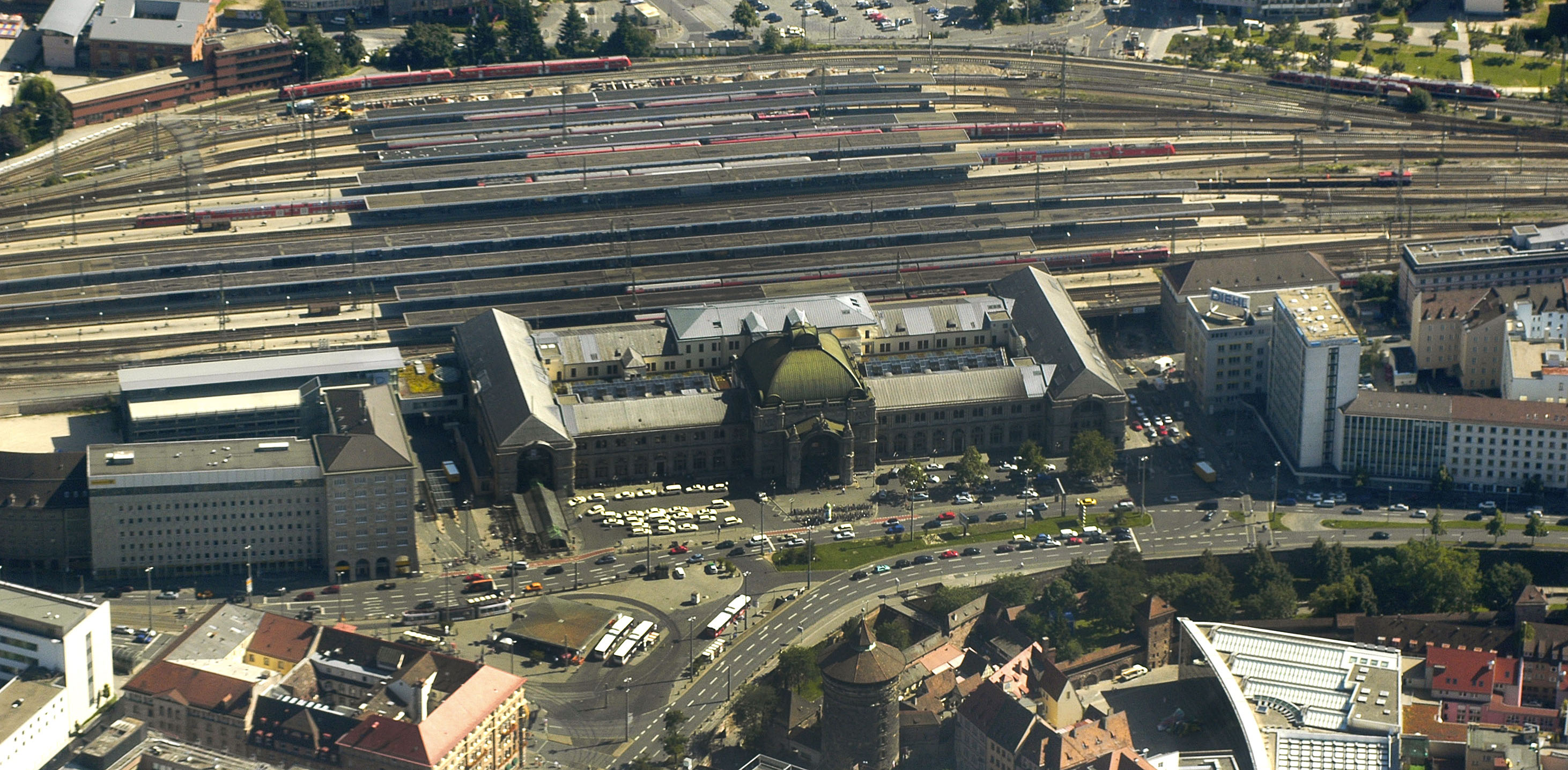
Aerial photo 2009

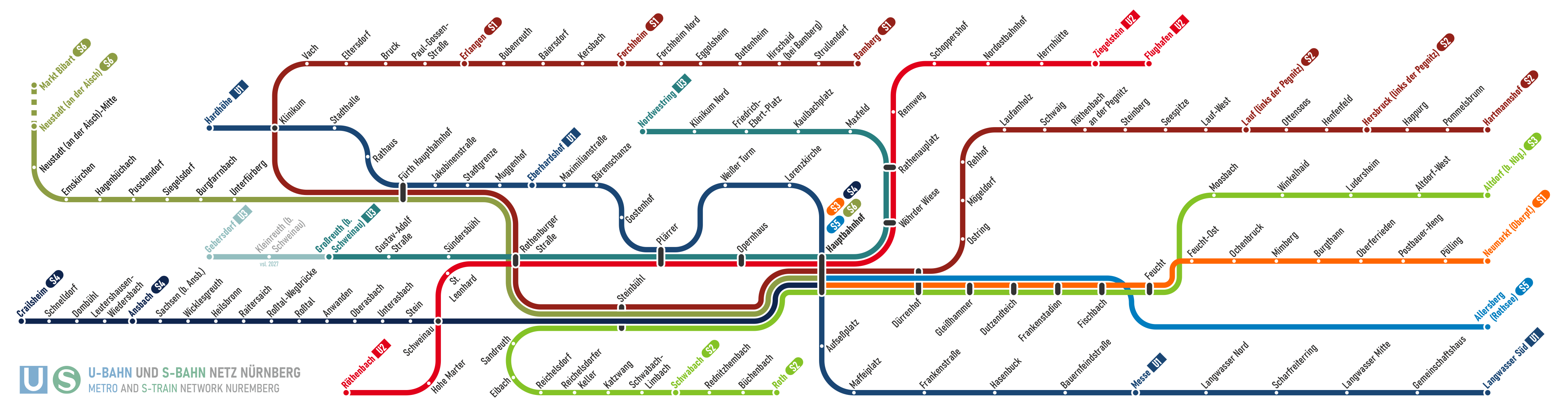
Nürnberg Hauptbahnhof is the centre of the S- and U-Bahn networks

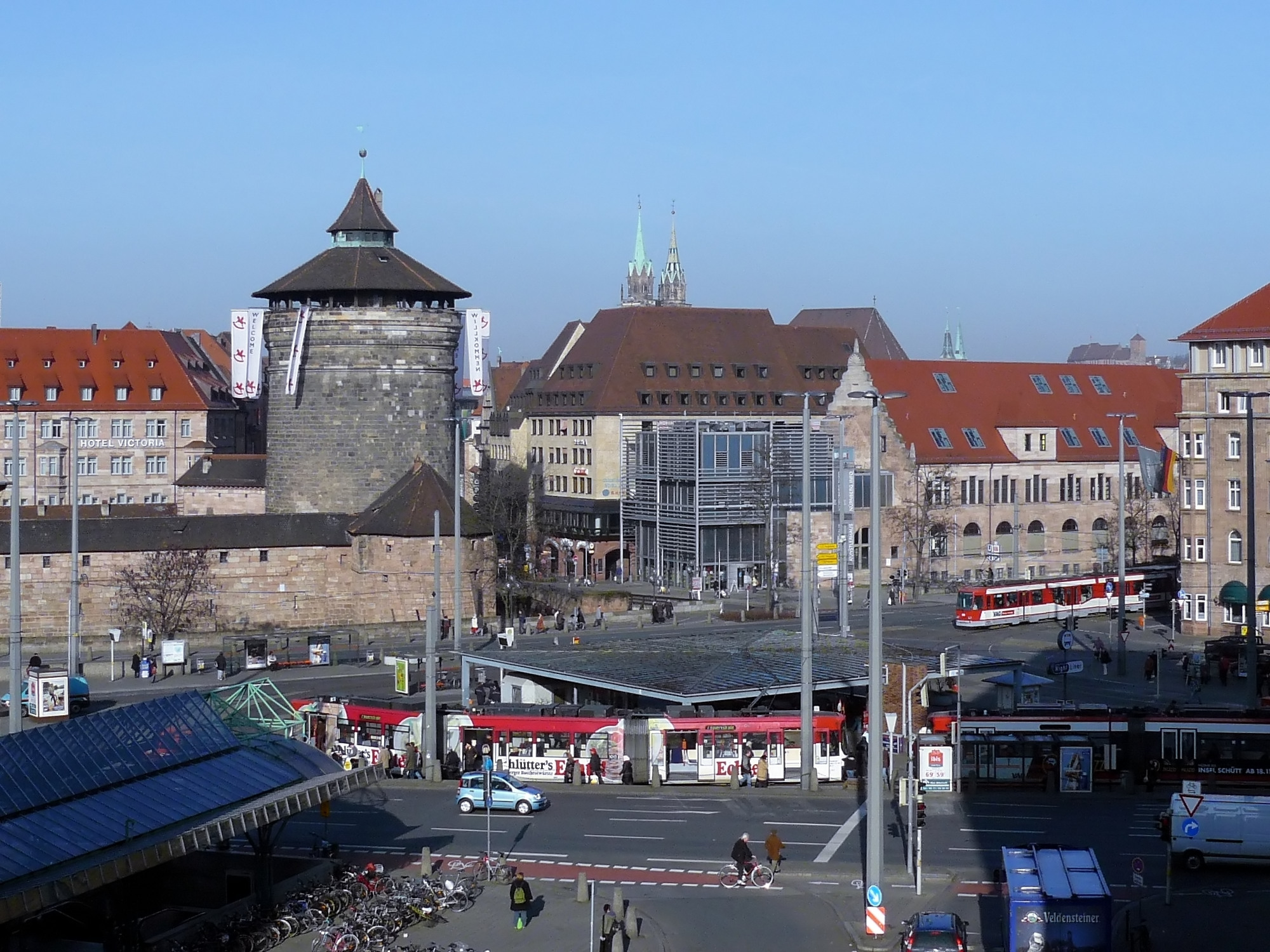
Station square with tram stops

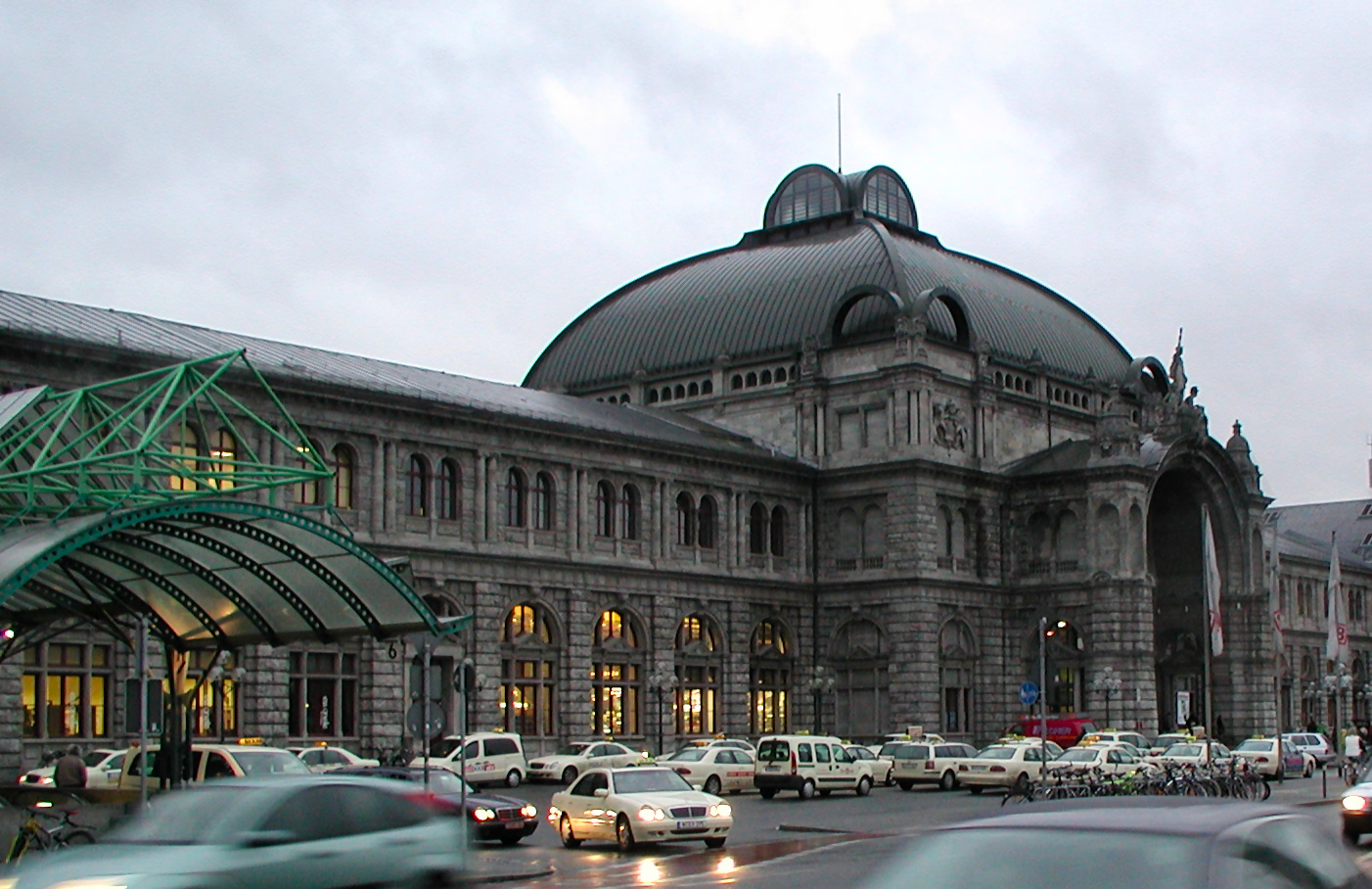
Taxicab stand

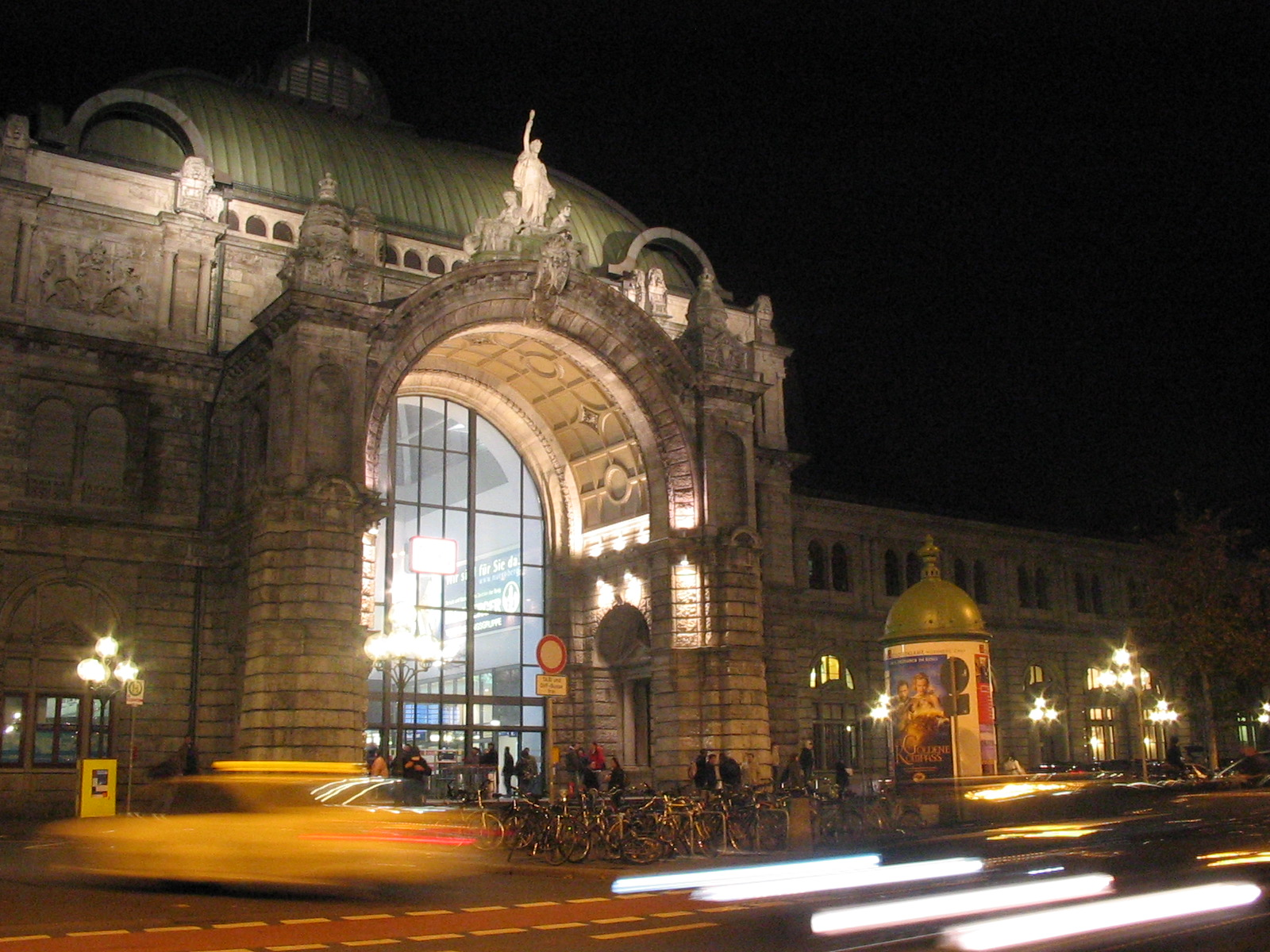
Middle section of Nuremberg Hauptbahnhof at night

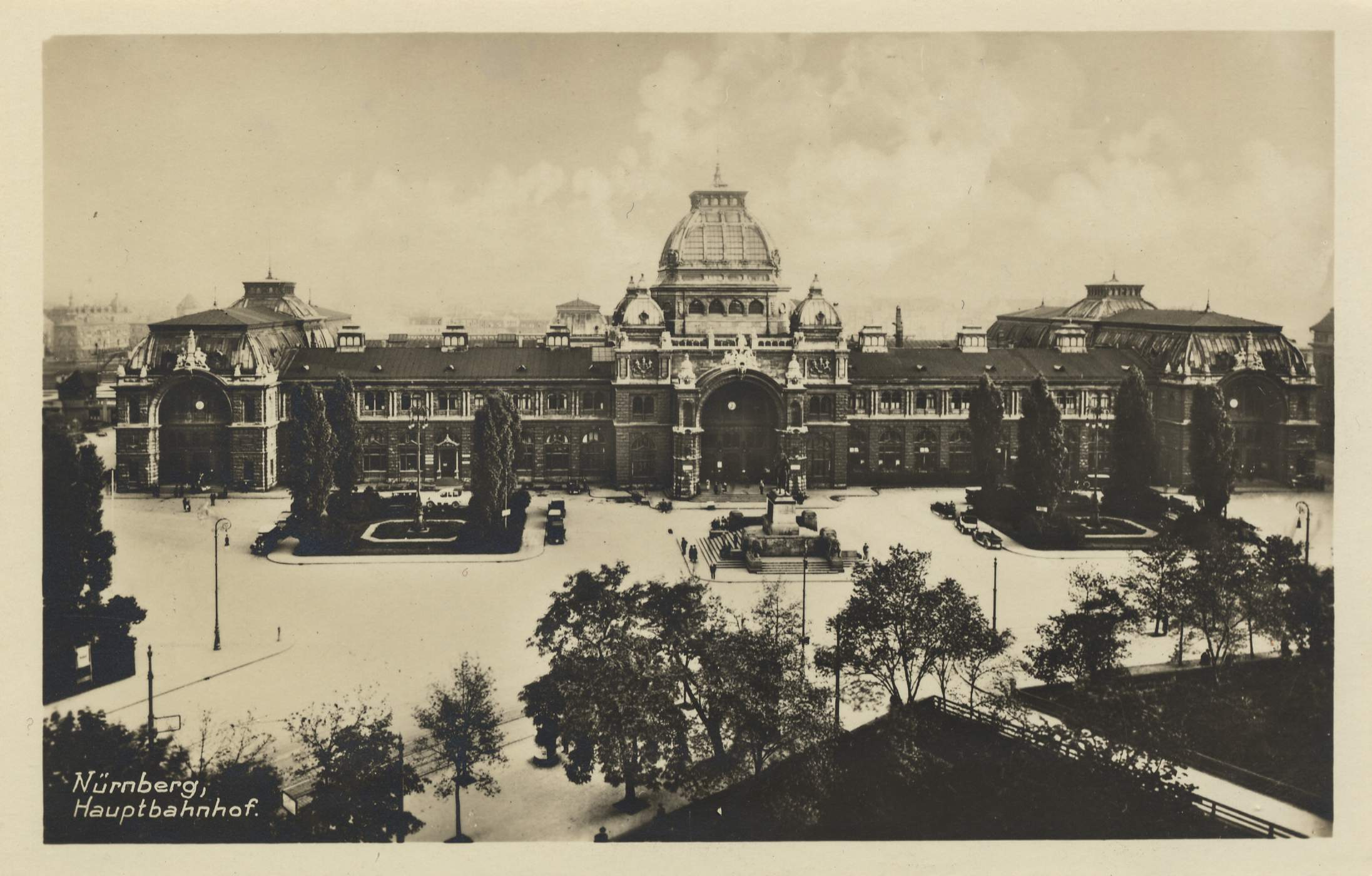
The Station after the first rebuilding (1900–1906)

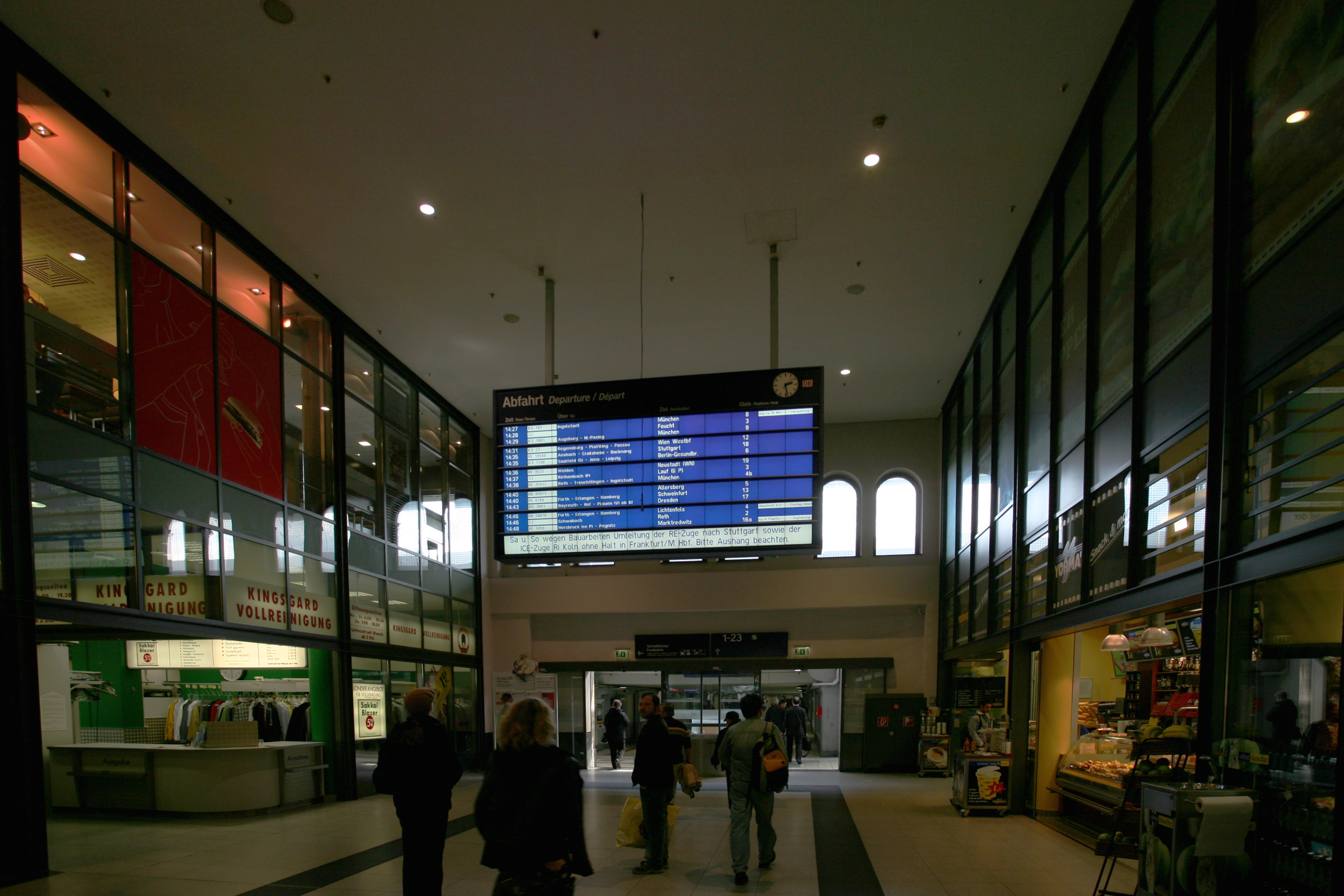
"Osthalle" after rebuilding in 2002

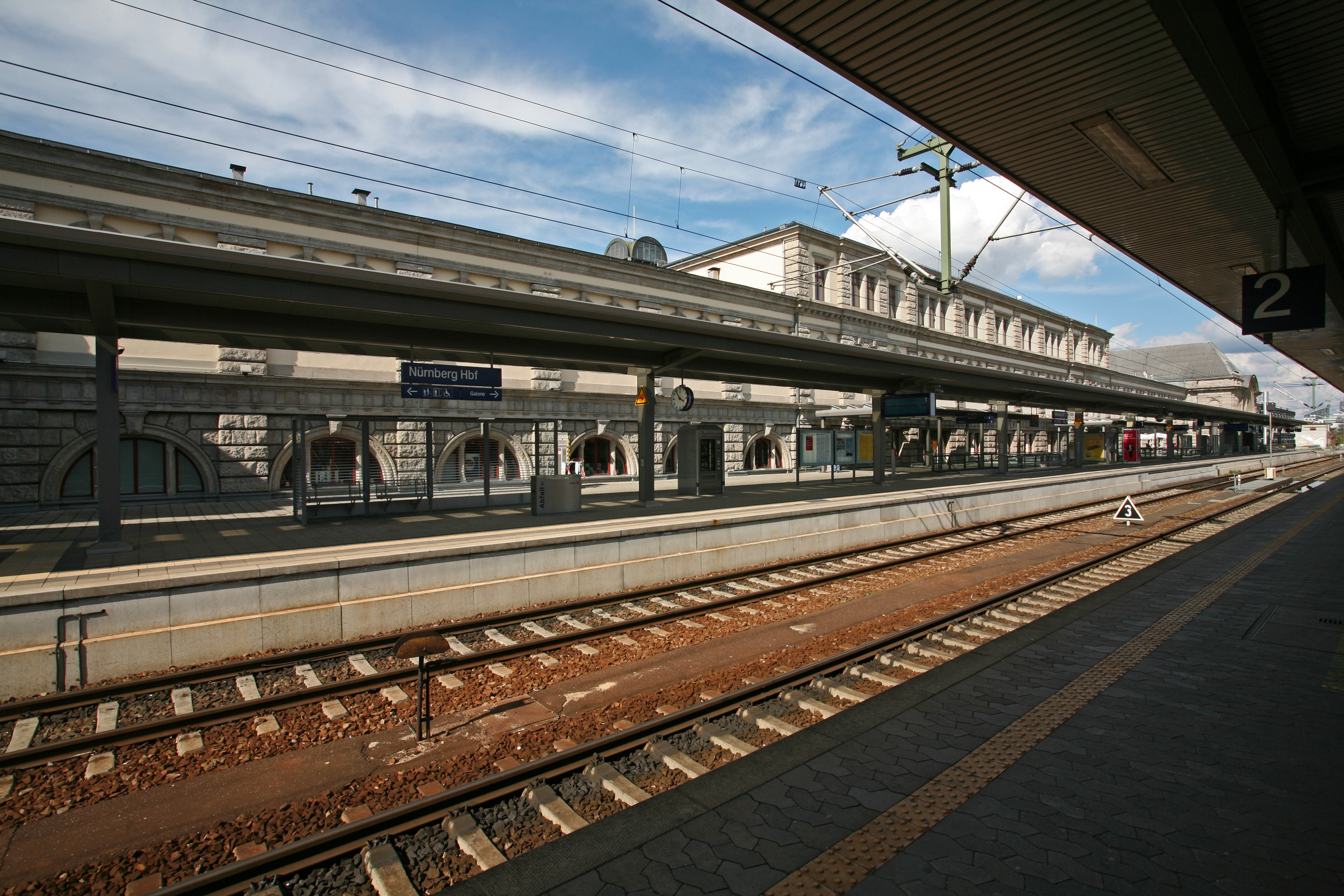
Platform 1, adjacent to the station building at the first floor level. This platform is used mainly for S-Bahn trains.

== See also ==
- List of railway stations in Bavaria
- Hauptbahnhof
- Rail transport in Germany

== Sources ==
- Karl Heinz Ferstl, Heinrich W. Kaiser, Hauptbahnhof Nürnberg, Geschichte und Visionen, Haidhausen Verlag, Munich, 2002, ISBN 3-926429-15-1
