= Bärental (Upper Franconia) =

Valley in the district of Lichtenfels in Bavaria

- Location within Bavaria
- Floor elevation: 340 to 465
- Length: 3.7 km (2.3 mi)

Geology
- Type: notch valley

Geography
- Location: Weismain, District of Lichtenfels, Oberfranken, Bavaria, Germany
- Coordinates: 50°3′36″N 11°15′22″E
- Rivers: Krassach River
- Interactive map of Bärental

The Bärental is a small, 3.7 km long left-side valley of the Weismain Valley funnel within the Weismain-Alb region. It is situated entirely within the town of Weismain in the Lichtenfels district of Bavaria. This valley is located in the northernmost region of the Franconian Alb and is traversed by the Krassach River. Within the valley, there are 16 inhabitants, including the village of Krassach, 66 people (as of 1 January 2012). The three inhabited settlements are Herbstmühle, Krassacher Mühle, and Krassach. The valley holds appeal for hikers and is situated entirely within the nature park of Franconian Switzerland Veldensteiner Forest.

== Geography and description ==
The Bärental originates from the Franconian Alb, located approximately two kilometers northeast of Seubersdorf, at an elevation of around 465 meters above sea level. Initially, the valley follows a westerly course before curving northward just prior to reaching Wunkendorf. This bend in the valley is marked by two distinctive natural formations, the Juraturm and Geierstein, both of which are prominent rock needles, each standing at a height of 25 meters. In the valley, there are other prominent rock formations such as the Bärentalwächter, the Felsentor, the Wunkendorfer Eck, and the Krassacher Wand. In proximity to the Juraturm lies the Bärenloch, the valley's primary cave, which is accessible to the public. The Bärenloch is a horizontal karst cave with dimensions of approximately 12 meters in length, 4 meters in width, and 3–4 meters in height. Bone remains of cave bears have been found in the smaller Fuchsenhöhle. The Krassach River originates approximately 300 meters north of these two rock formations, with the Herbstmühle mill positioned another 300 meters to the north.

Upon reaching Krassacher Mühle, the valley widens considerably, which, according to the narrower definition, marks the conclusion of the Bärental, spanning approximately 3 kilometers. The subsequent village is Krassach. North of Krassach, the valley expands further, taking on a plain character. To the east, north of Krassach, the Zillertal valley intersects, housing the village of Niesten. As the valley progresses, it forms the "Weismain Valley funnel," which also incorporates the flow of the Kleinziegenfelder Tal.

== Geology ==
At the beginning of the Bärental, the Kerbtal cuts into the upper Malm-δ marl limestones. Moving forward, the operational limestones of the Malm-β- to -α strata intercede, giving rise to the springs of the Krassach. This is followed by the lower marl limestones of the same Malm strata, although these are primarily concealed by debris and sedimentary deposits along the valley floor. As one progresses beyond the Krassach mill, the Dogger layer becomes evident.

The Bärental of Wunkendorf has been officially recognized as a valuable geotope (geotope number: 478R019) by the Bavarian State Office for the Environment.

== Flora and Fauna ==
=== Flora ===
The Bärental can be subdivided into two distinct natural zones. The initial section, commencing at the Krassacher Mühle, exhibits open meadows along the valley floor and a combination of mixed and deciduous forests at its edges. Along the banks near the Krassach area, alders and willows predominantly flourish. From the Herbstmühle, the open spaces give way to a continuous forested area. Initially, a planted spruce forest begins, but it grows out of place near the stream and therefore displaces numerous other species. In proximity to the calcareous Krassach spring, one encounters more confined stream ash woods, where dense clusters of the counter-leaved spleenwort also thrive during the spring season. The slender thickets of alder, ash, and willow adorning the riverbanks serve as vestiges of the ancient floodplain forests. These forests were cleared due to human land utilization during the Middle Ages, leaving behind only diminutive remnants. Towards the end of the valley deciduous and mixed forests alternate again.

A distinctive feature of the Bärental is the presence of the Ade's mealyberry species (Sorbus adeana). This particular mealyberry is a localized endemic species within the valley. Similar to the Kordigast mealyberry, it was discovered in the 1990s by biologist Norbert Meyer, who specializes in mealyberries, and was named after botanist Alfred Ade. Ade conducted botanical research in the Weismain area during the early 20th century and provided the first comprehensive description of the indigenous flora. Apart from the Bärental, Ade's mealyberry is exclusively found in the Kleinziegenfeld valley.

=== Fauna ===
The wildlife inhabiting the Bärental closely resembles that was found in other woodland regions of Upper Franconia. Consequently, the area boasts a diverse array of species, encompassing insects, vertebrates, small mammals, songbirds, birds of prey, and larger mammals like red deer and wild boar. Notably, the valley serves as a habitat for various larger birds of prey, including the majestic eagle owl. Nestled upon the rocky needle Juraturm is an annually inhabited eyrie, which is easily visible from the hiking trail through the valley.

== Settlement, population, and infrastructure ==
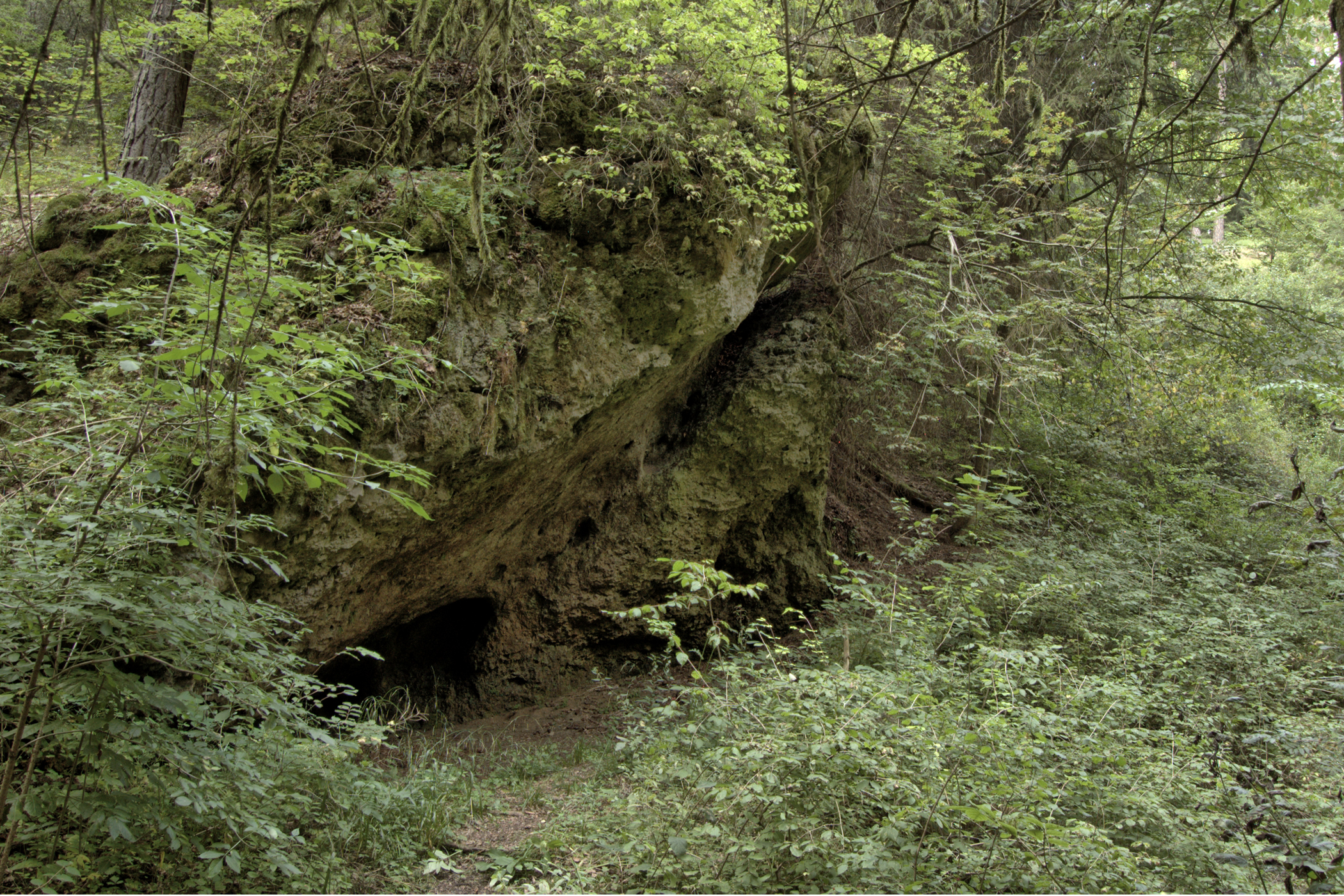
The Sloping Wall in Bear Valley (2012)

The valley is home to both the Herbstmühle and the Krassacher Mühle, contributing a combined population of 16 residents (as of 1 January 2012). The inclusion of the village Krassach adds another 50 inhabitants to this count. Since the Krassacher Mühle was built in 1286 at the latest, a permanent settlement of the valley can be assumed since then. The construction of the Herbstmühle, on the other hand, can be traced to no later than the late 18th century. The most ancient signs of human habitation within the valley were unearthed beneath the rock overhang known as Schräge Wand. Radiocarbon dating places these artifacts at around 8000 years old, representing the Middle Stone Age.

Branching off from the district road LIF 24 that runs from Weismain towards Neudorf, a narrow asphalt road leads through Krassach to reach the Krassacher Mühle. Beyond the mill, a well-maintained gravel forest road commences, leading to the Herbstmühle. From there, a paved footpath branches off to Wunkendorf, while another extends to the valley's terminus. In order to ensure the safety of climbers in Bärental and Kleinziegenfelder Tal, a station and lodging are provided by the Kulmbach mountain rescue division, housed within an outbuilding of the mill.

== Culture, customs, and tourism ==
Every year on May 1, a major festival is held in a large clearing at the southern end of the Bärental. There is a large crucifix and a statue of the Madonna is embedded in a rock grotto. Bärental is visited by numerous hikers in spring, summer, and fall because of its quiet location and largely untouched nature. The valley's climbing rocks have garnered national renown within climbing circles. Additionally, the local mountain guard division stationed at Herbstmühle organizes the annual Juraturm festival on October 3.
