= Kleinziegenfelder Tal =

Valley in Upper Franconia

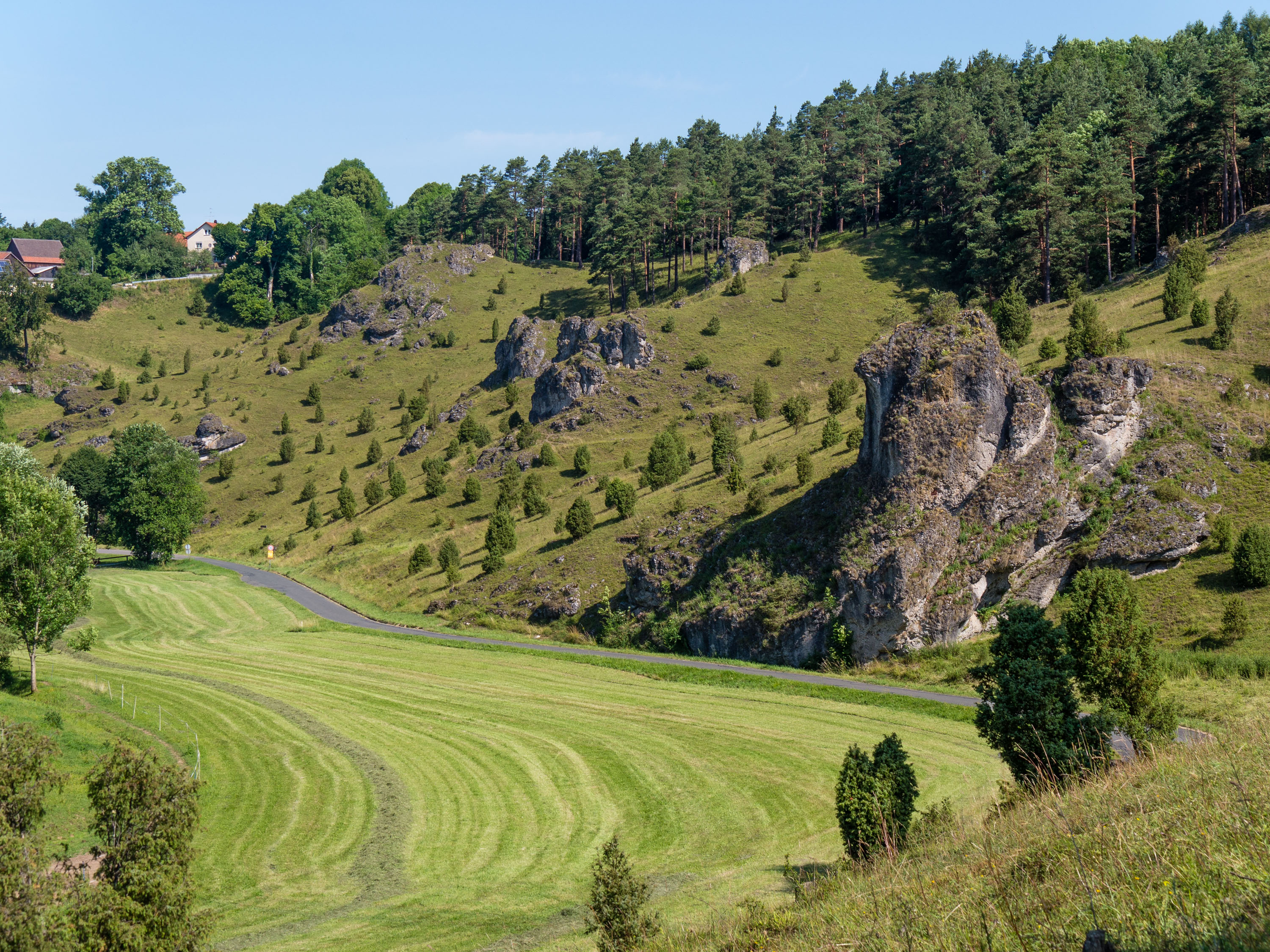
- Juniper slopes near Kleinziegenfeld

- Location within Bavaria
- Floor elevation: 330 to 440m above sea level NN
- Length: 12 km (7.5 mi)

Geology
- Type: notch valley

Geography
- Location: Weismain, district of Lichtenfels, Upper Franconia, Bavaria, Germany
- Coordinates: 50°1′N 11°12′E
- Interactive map of Kleinziegenfelder Tal
- The usage of the valley is for agricultural, forestry and tourist purpose.

Kleinziegenfelder Tal (lit German: Kleinziegenfeld Valley) is approximately twelve kilometers long, located in Upper Franconia. It serves as the starting point of the Weismain Valley funnel in the Weismain-Alb region and is entirely situated within the town of Weismain, in the Lichtenfels district of Bavaria. The valley lies in the northernmost part of the Franconian Alb and is traversed by the Weismain River. It encompasses several inhabited settlements, with a combined population of approximately 240 residents. The valley is entirely encompassed by the Franconian Switzerland - Franconian Jura Nature Park and is particularly popular among hikers and motorcyclists.

== Description ==
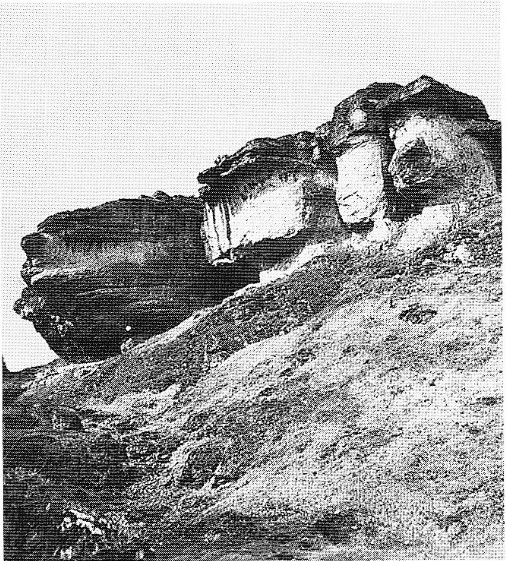
The Klinge rock formation near Ehrhardsmühle (Weismain) in the Kleinziegenfelder Valley; The photo from 1935 clearly shows how tree-free the valley was at the time

The valley stretches in a north–south direction, situated between the towns of Weismain and Kleinziegenfeld in the Lichtenfels district of Upper Franconia. It is located approximately 24 kilometers northeast of Bamberg. Flowing through the valley is the Weismain River, and the entire area is designated as a protected nature reserve. The sides of the valley are formed by towering limestone cliffs, which are eagerly used by climbers. Within the valley, one can find the villages of Kleinziegenfeld, Großziegenfeld, Arnstein, Wallersberg, Schammendorf, and Weismain, all of which are part of the town of Weismain. The valley is renowned for its notable rock formations, including the Red Wall, Rolands Rock, Petrified Giant, Blade, Stone Monk, and Praying Nun. A local legend surrounds the Stone Monk, claiming that "once upon a time, a hermit resided there, who, on the day of his passing, directed Christ away from the door as he journeyed through the Kleinziegenfeld Valley, and consequently, turned into stone." The Stone Monk stands as an iconic symbol of Weismain.

== Flora ==
The Kleinziegenfeld Valley is characterized by its dense deciduous and mixed forests. In the vicinity of Kleinziegenfeld and Wallersberg, there are predominantly dry and semi-dry grassland slopes adorned with scattered juniper growth. These slopes have been shaped over centuries through the extensive sheep-grazing practices of the local villagers in the Jura region. The continuous grazing prevented the proliferation of dense vegetation, and the shepherds would periodically clear the juniper bushes to maintain clear sightlines for monitoring their herds.

The valley boasts a diverse array of flora, including a variety of flowers, grasses, and ferns. Among them are columbines, mountain asters, yews, fringed gentians, spring gentians, large-flowered foxgloves, honeysuckles, golden thistles, pasque flowers, perennial flaxes, liverworts, lilies of the valley, various orchids, carnations, Solomon's seals, cowslips, daphnes, ostrich ferns, Turk's cap lily, centauries, white helleborine and red helleborine, pseudorchis albida, and willowleaf yellowleaf. Some of these plant species are considered rare, endangered, and thus protected.

== Tourist Attractions ==
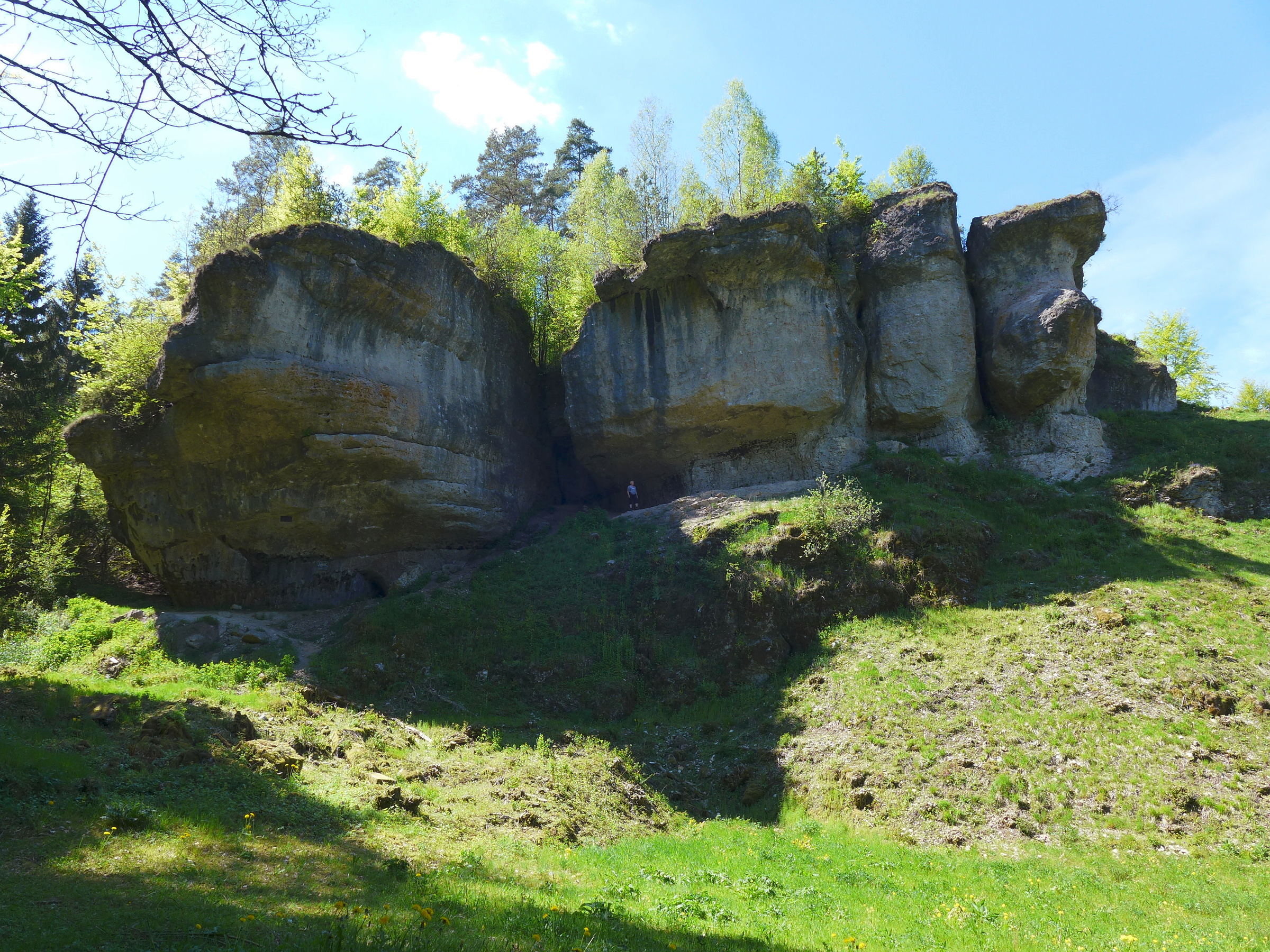
Blade, 2017

The Kleinziegenfeld Valley consists of rocky hills, castle ruins, romantic half-timbered villages, and numerous mills. One of its notable attractions is the presence of the Apollo butterfly, which represents the last known occurrence of this species in Franconia. This butterfly is closely associated with the open, unspoiled limestone cliffs found in the area. The caterpillars of the Apollo butterfly rely solely on the white stonecrop (Sedum album) as their food source, which grows exclusively in this region. Additionally, visitors can admire the juniper slope near Kleinziegenfeld, where a statue of a cyclist is visible on a rock above the village.

=== Statue of cyclist Claudius ===
The original statue of a cyclist was installed in 1905 by two brothers from Kleinziegenfeld, who aimed to create a distinctive landmark in the area. Using sawdust and wood, they crafted a life-sized figure dressed in a tailcoat and top hat, mounted on a penny-farthing bicycle, and securely positioned it on the rock. Interestingly, this bicycle was also the first and only one in Kleinziegenfeld at that time. The idea for this unique installation was proposed by Georg Ammon, a grammar school professor in Regensburg who hailed from Kleinziegenfeld. The exact motivation behind the statue's placement is no longer documented, and several theories exist: it might have been erected to commemorate the era when the Kleinziegenfeld valley attracted numerous cyclists or to serve as a contrast to the cannons and dragoons situated on other rocky outcrops. Another explanation suggests that a cyclist once intended to cross the valley using a bridge that had long vanished, and instead of turning back, he is immortalized on the rock to this day.

Initially, the figure stood on the rock for several years until it was blown away during a strong storm. In 1933, a new statue of a cyclist was built. Because it carried a swastika flag, the statue was dismantled during World War II so as not to draw the attention of the Allies to the village. In 1952, a third statue was built, which had to be renovated in 1971 after vandalism. In the process, the legs and arms were made of solid spruce wood with joints. The Claudius statue has carried a red and white flag since 1952.

=== Hiking trails ===
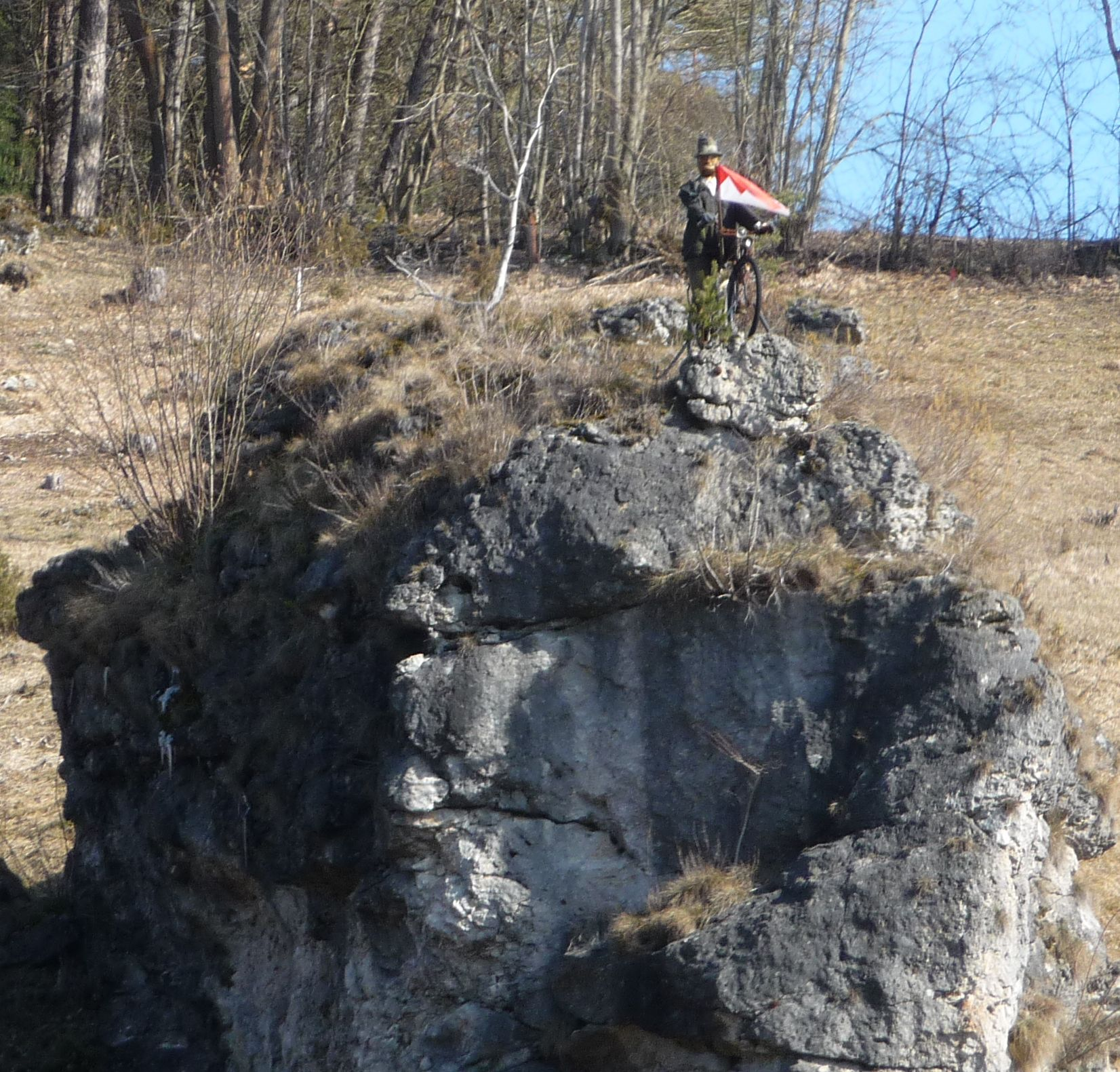
Cyclist statue Claudius

Apollofalter-Wanderweg (Apollo butterfly trail): A designated circular hiking route, approximately six kilometers in length, was established by the Landschaftspflegeverband Lichtenfels e.V. (Lichtenfels Landscape Conservation Association) and the Bavarian State Ministry for the Environment and Consumer Protection. It traverses the central part of the valley and connects the villages of Weihersmühle, Arnstein, Kleinziegenfeld, and Schrepfersmühle. Two small parking lots near Kleinziegenfeld and Arnstein, equipped with information boards, serve as convenient entry points for hikers. The paths along the trail are mainly paved, but there are also sections with gravel. Additionally, the hiking trail offers opportunities to explore additional routes and extend the hiking experience. The primary objective of the trail is to provide a chance to explore and gain knowledge about the natural habitat of the rare Apollo butterfly.
