= Krassach River =

River in Upper Franconia

Krassach
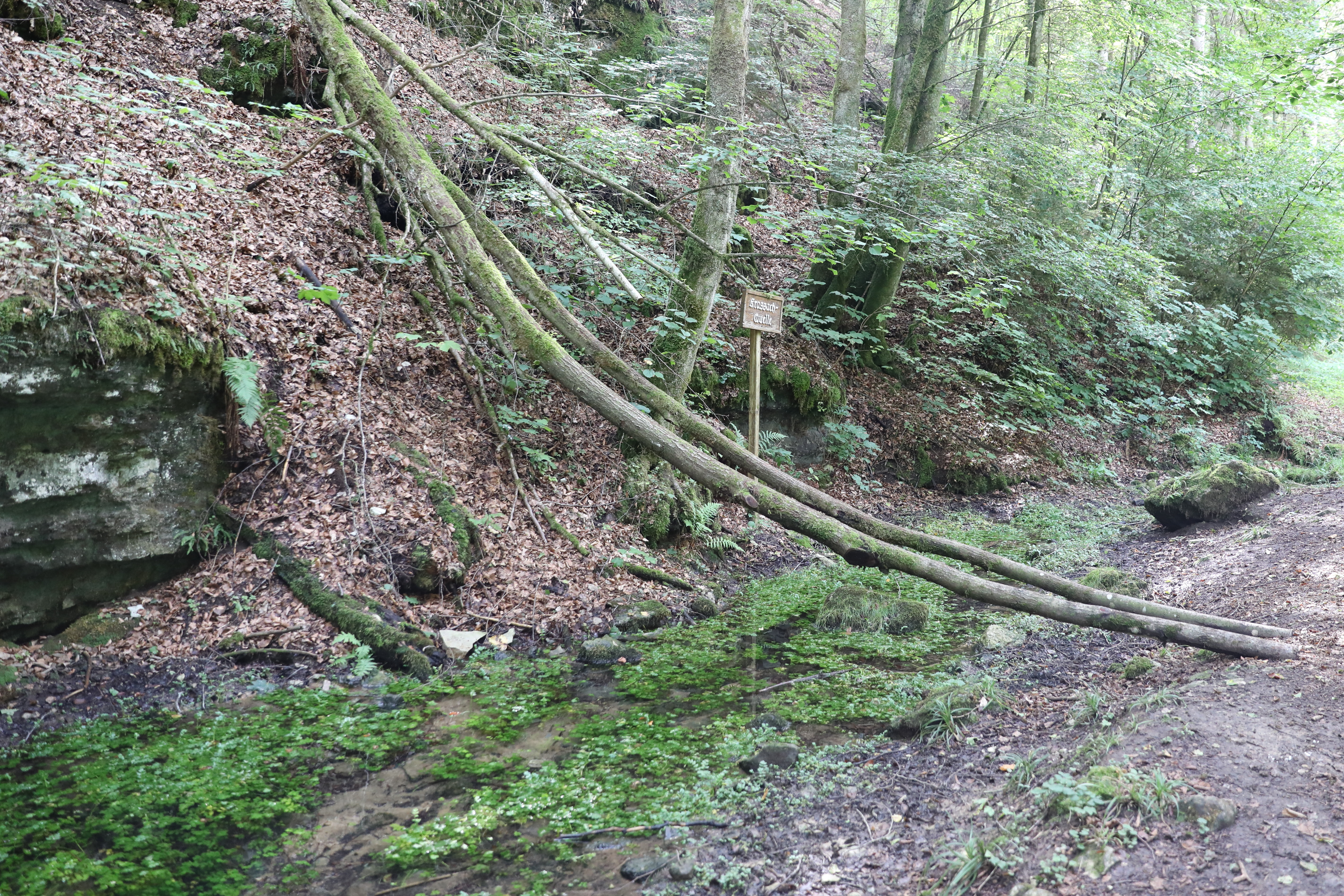
- Krassach spring in Bärental

Location
- Country: Germany
- State: Bavaria
- District: Upper Franconia, district of Lichtenfels

Physical characteristics
- Source
  - location: Bärental
  - coordinates: 50°2′28″N 11°15′33″E
- Length: 1.7 km (1.1 mi)
- Basin size: 2,676 km^{2} (1,033 sq mi)

The Krassach is a left tributary of the Weismain about 7 kilometers long, which flows into the Main near Altenkunstadt in Upper Franconia.

== Geography ==
=== Source ===
The Krassach spring lies in the middle of the Bärental, about 300 meters south of the Herbstmühle. It emerges as a stratified spring, formed by several small springs merging directly at the foot of the eastern slope of the Bärental. Among its sources, the spring is fed by a small underground stream that initially vanishes as a stream bend in the rear section of the Bärental. Just after the spring, a small weir splits the stream into its natural course and the Mühlbach (mill stream) leading to the Herbstmühle (Herbst mill). According to ancient tales, the spring used to surface further upstream from its present location.

=== History and description ===
From its source, the Krassach meanders through the Bärental, maintaining its natural flow, although some straightened sections exist. The Mühlbach (mill stream) of the Herbstmühle (Herbst mill) is relatively short, about 370 meters, and rejoins the brook immediately after passing the mill. Around 500 meters further, another Mühlbach branches off, belonging to the Krassacher Mühle (Krassach mill). This stream, about 600 meters in length, runs mostly parallel to the Krassach, about 50 meters apart, and reunites with the brook at the end of the Bärental.

As the Krassach continues, human interventions have straightened their course, particularly in the Krassach district of Weismain. It flows past several fish ponds used for trout breeding and is joined by its only significant tributary, the Niestener Mühlbach, on the left side near Niesten. About 300 meters downstream is the Rumpelwehr, a natural waterfall falling down over two sintered and moss-covered steps. Following this waterfall, a third Mühlbach splits off from the Krassach. It starts as a free-flowing stream and is later channeled through the town area of Weismain, eventually emptying into the Weismain River near the Püls brewery. The Weismain Mühlbach was historically used to power the Kastenmühle (box mill), among other purposes.

== Biology ==
=== Flora ===
The entire length of the Krassach River is flanked mainly by alder and willow trees. The upper reaches have increasingly narrow stream-ash forests, especially near the calcareous spring. During spring, dense stands of the counter-leaved spleenwort also flourish in these areas. The narrow groves of alder, ash, and willow along the riverbanks are remnants of former floodplain forests, which were mostly cleared through human land use during the Middle Ages, leaving only small remnants behind. However, these remaining groves play a crucial role in protecting the stream. They act as buffer strips between the river and adjacent agriculture, offering shade that helps keep the Krassach from warming. The stream bed and the riparian areas are richly structured, except for the straightened sections in Krassach and Weismain, and shallower areas alternate with deeper ones. Also, in its upper reaches, the Krassach has a lively alternation of feeder-rich, faster-flowing and shallower, slower-flowing sections of water.

=== Fauna ===
The Krassach River is a habitat for various species, including bullheads, brook lampreys, and brown trout. Additionally, stoneflies, small and large dragonfly larvae, mayfly larvae, caddisfly larvae, gammarus fossarum, and flatworms thrive in its waters. There have been occasional sightings of fire salamanders and damselflies as well.
