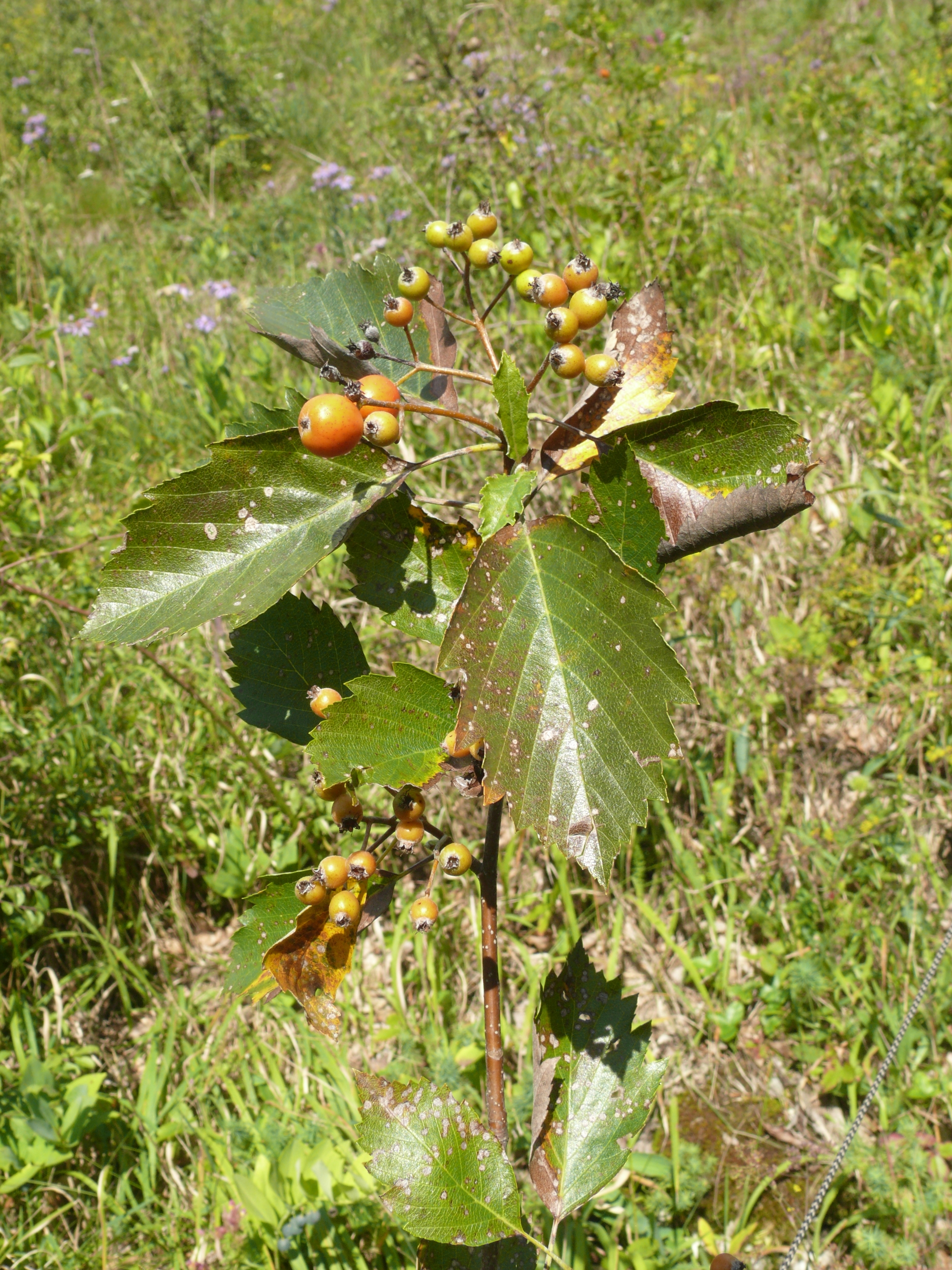

Conservation status
- Endangered (IUCN 3.1)

Scientific classification
- Kingdom: Plantae
- Clade: Tracheophytes
- Clade: Angiosperms
- Clade: Eudicots
- Clade: Rosids
- Order: Rosales
- Family: Rosaceae
- Genus: Aria
- Species: A. adeana

Binomial name
- Aria adeana (N.Mey.) Mosyakin, Fedor. & McNeill

Synonyms
- Karpatiosorbus adeana (N.Mey.) Sennikov & Kurtto; Pyrus adeana (N.Mey.) M.F.Fay & Christenh.; Sorbus adeana N.Mey.

= Aria adeana =

Species of flowering plant

Aria adeana, the Ades whitebeam, is a species of plant that belongs to the complex of bastard whitebeams (Aria latifolia agg.) within the family Rosaceae. This deciduous tree is the result of a hybridization between the common whitebeam (Aria edulis) and the wild service tree (Aria torminalis). As an agamospermous species, it reproduces asexually. It is endemic to the Bärental and the adjacent Kleinziegenfelder Valley in Upper Franconia (Bavaria, Germany).

== Description ==
The Ades whitebeam is a deciduous tree. The leaves are oval-shaped with pronounced and deeply lobed, slightly spreading teeth. The leaf sizes vary between lengths of 6 to 8 cm (2.4 to 3.1 in) and widths of 5 to 6 cm (2.0 to 2.4 in); the short lobe side is usually over 1 cm (0.39 in) long. The leaf base angle is generally less than 90°. Each leaf typically has about eight pairs of veins. (See also leaf shape) The pomes ripen in early autumn. They are small, pear-shaped, yellowish fruits with a red-orange cheek. Reproduction occurs with seeds that are produced without sexual processes, making this plant species agamospermous.

== Taxonomy ==
It was first described as Sorbus adeana N.Mey. in by Norbert Meyer in 2005. It was moved to the genus Aria (Pers.) J.Jacq. ex Host as Aria adeana (N.Mey.) Mosyakin, Fedor. & McNeill by Sergei Leonidovich Mosyakin, Mykola Mykhaylovych Fedoronchuk, and John McNeill in 2025. The Ades whitebeam, like the closely related Kordigast Whitebeam, was discovered in the 1990s by biologist Norbert Meyer, who specializes in whitebeam species, and was named after the botanist Alfred Ade. Ade was active in the Weismain region in the early 20th century and was the first to extensively describe the local flora.

== Distribution and habitat ==
This is an endemic species in the Bärental and the adjacent Kleinziegenfelder Valley. It grows exclusively in the local beech forests, on the numerous prominent rocks, and on fallow grasslands.

== Conservation ==
Due to its small distribution range, it is generally considered quite rare, but it is not considered endangered by the Federal Species Protection Ordinance, and thus is not afforded special protection. In Upper Franconia, however, it is considered potentially endangered due to its rarity. Within Germany, Bavaria holds the sole responsibility for the conservation of this species.
