= Wiesen =

Wiesen may refer to:

- Wiesen, Switzerland, part of the city of Davos
  - Wiesen (Rhaetian Railway station)
  - Wiesen Viaduct, a railway viaduct
- Wiesen, Bavaria, a community
- Wiesen, Austria, a village
- Wiesen (Bad Staffelstein), a borough of the town of Bad Staffelstein
- Wiesen (restaurant), a Michelin starred restaurant in Eindhoven, The Netherlands
- Wiesen (surname)

== See also ==
- Wiesensee, an artificial lake in the Westerwald mountain range of Germany
