= Redwitz an der Rodach (Verwaltungsgemeinschaft) =

- Verwaltungsgemeinschaft
- Location of Redwitz an der Rodach within Lichtenfels district
- Interactive map of Redwitz an der Rodach
- Location within Germany Location within Bavaria
- Coordinates: 50°10′N 11°12′E
- Country: Germany
- State: Bavaria
- Admin. region: Upper Franconia
- District: Lichtenfels
- Seat: Redwitz an der Rodach
- Subdivisions: 2 municipalities

Area
  - Total: 18.41 km^{2} (7.11 sq mi)

Population (2025-12-31)
  - Total: 4,509
  - Density: 244.9/km^{2} (634.3/sq mi)
- Time zone: UTC+01:00 (CET)
  - Summer (DST): UTC+02:00 (CEST)
- Website: www.redwitz.de

Redwitz an der Rodach is a Verwaltungsgemeinschaft (municipal association) in the district of Lichtenfels in Bavaria, Germany. Its seat is in Redwitz an der Rodach.

It consists of the following municipalities:

1. Marktgraitz
2. Redwitz an der Rodach
