= Frauendorf (Bad Staffelstein) =

Coordinates: 50°04′16″N 11°03′39″E

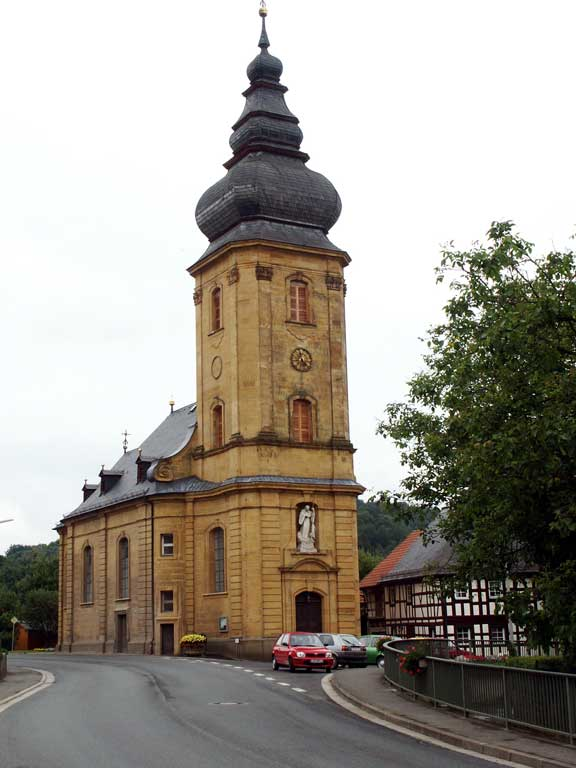
St. Ägidius Church, Frauendorf, Bad Staffelstein

Frauendorf is a borough of Bad Staffelstein in the Bavarian region of Upper Franconia. The town's name harks back to the year 1070, when it served as a gift to enable the establishment of the Frauenkloster (Monastery of Our Lady).

The town's skyline is marked by the striking St. Ägidius Church, which was designed by the master architect Johann Thomas Nissler (1713–1769). He also oversaw the construction work at the Basilica of the Vierzehnheiligen for Balthasar Neumann, which is probably why the church is so stylistically similar to the cathedral.
