= Redwitz an der Rodach =

- Municipality
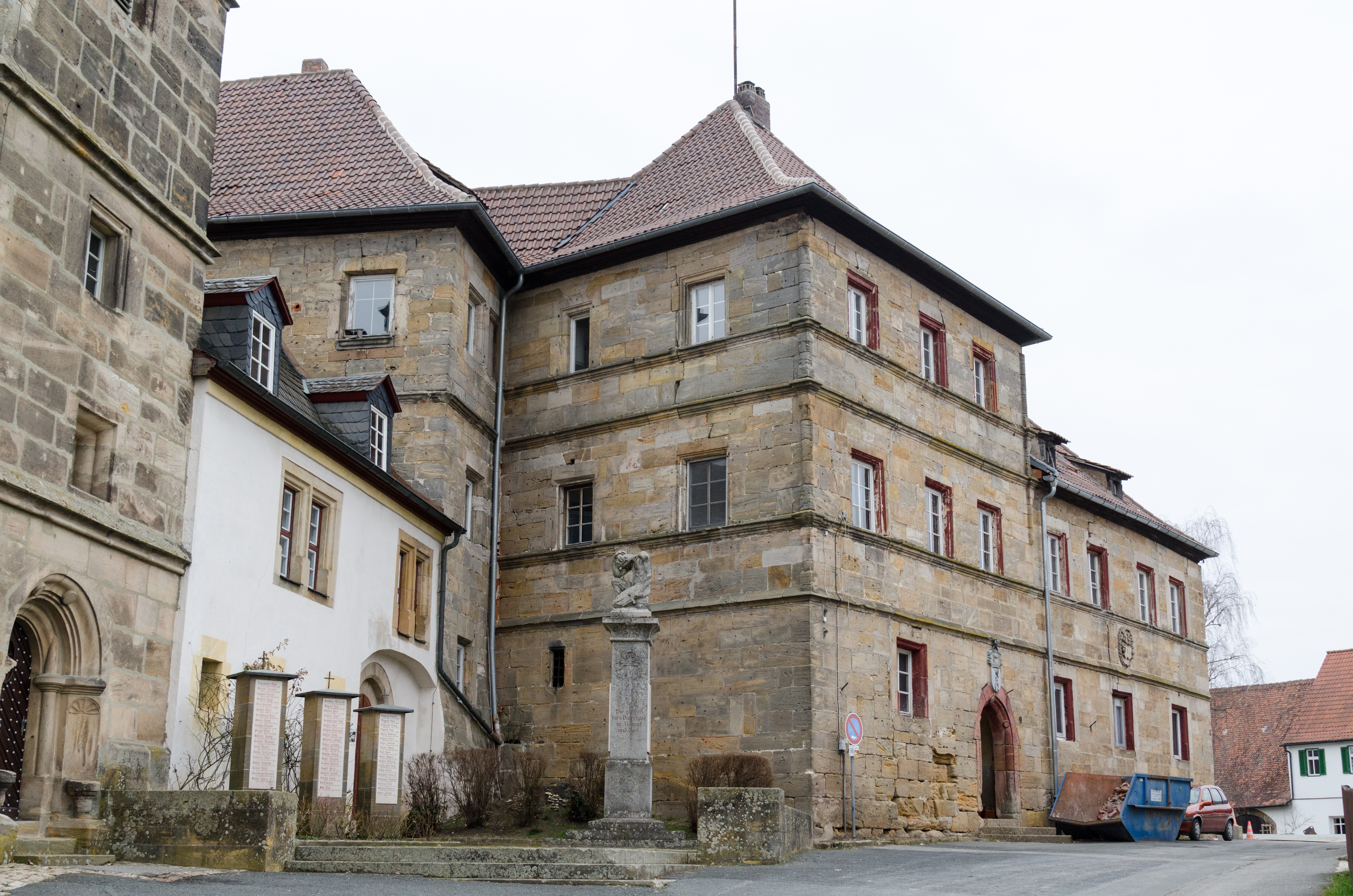
- Redwitz Castle

- Flag Coat of arms

- Location of Redwitz an der Rodach within Lichtenfels district
- Interactive map of Redwitz an der Rodach
- Location within Germany Location within Bavaria
- Coordinates: 50°10′19″N 11°12′23″E
- Country: Germany
- State: Bavaria
- Admin. region: Oberfranken
- District: Lichtenfels
- Municipal assoc.: Redwitz an der Rodach
- Subdivisions: 4 Ortsteile

Government
  - Mayor (2020–26): Jürgen Gäbelein

Area
  - Total: 14.66 km^{2} (5.66 sq mi)
- Elevation: 291 m (955 ft)

Population (2025-12-31)
  - Total: 3,405
  - Density: 232.3/km^{2} (601.6/sq mi)
- Time zone: UTC+01:00 (CET)
  - Summer (DST): UTC+02:00 (CEST)
- Postal codes: 96257
- Dialling codes: 09574
- Vehicle registration: LIF
- Website: www.redwitz.de

Redwitz an der Rodach (German pronunciation: [ˈʁɛtvɪts ʔan deːɐ̯ ˈʁoːdax], lit. 'Redwitz on the Rodach') is a municipality in the district of Lichtenfels in Bavaria in Germany. It lies on the river Rodach.
