= Hochstadt am Main =

Hochstadt a.Main
- Municipality
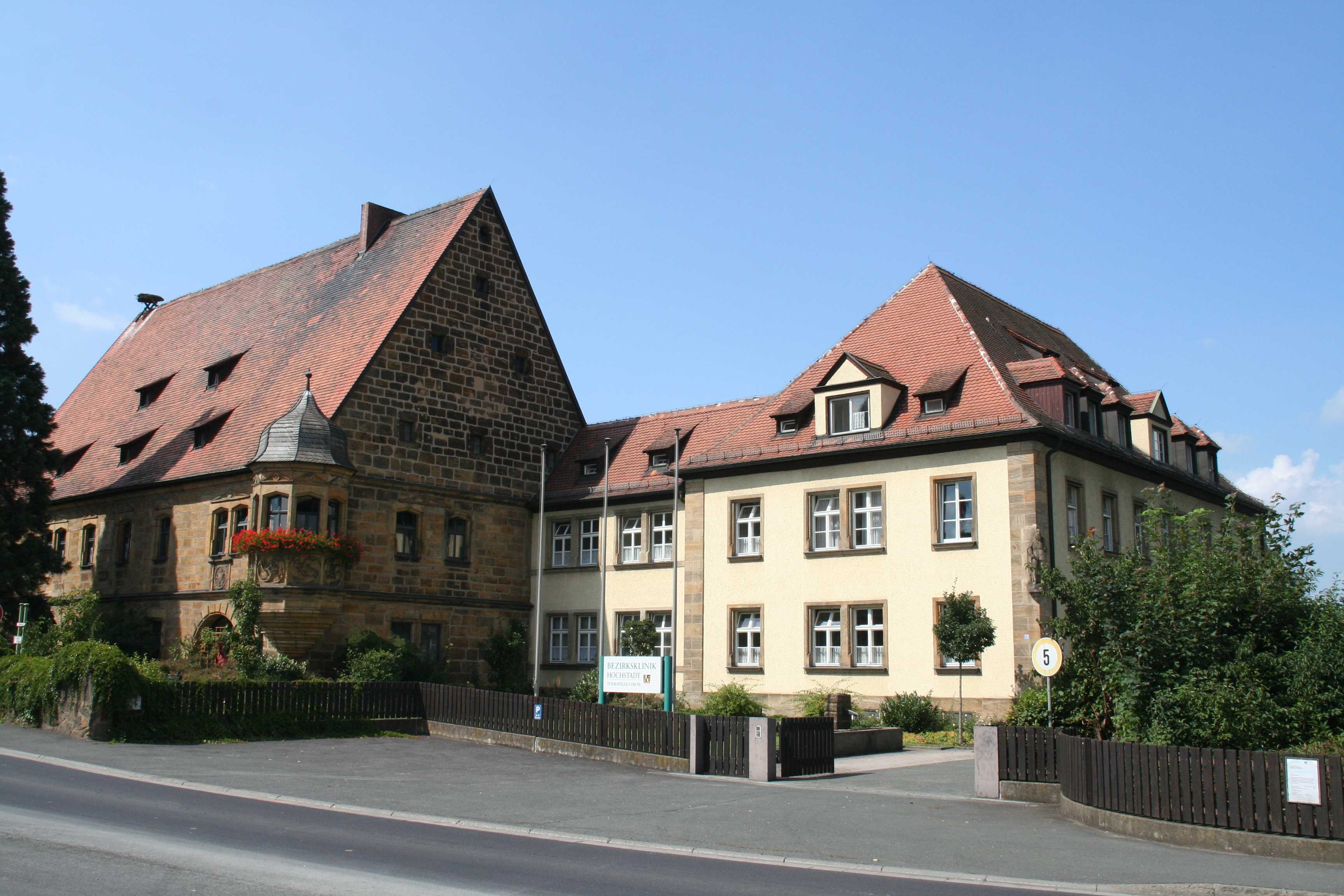
- Hospital in Hochstadt am Main

- Coat of arms

- Location of Hochstadt a.Main within Lichtenfels district
- Interactive map of Hochstadt a.Main
- Location within Germany Location within Bavaria
- Coordinates: 50°8′N 11°10′E
- Country: Germany
- State: Bavaria
- Admin. region: Oberfranken
- District: Lichtenfels
- Municipal assoc.: Hochstadt-Marktzeuln
- Subdivisions: 7 Ortsteile

Government
  - Mayor (2020–26): Max Zeulner (CSU)

Area
  - Total: 13.78 km^{2} (5.32 sq mi)
- Elevation: 281 m (922 ft)

Population (2025-12-31)
  - Total: 1,560
  - Density: 113/km^{2} (293/sq mi)
- Time zone: UTC+01:00 (CET)
  - Summer (DST): UTC+02:00 (CEST)
- Postal codes: 96272
- Dialling codes: 09574
- Vehicle registration: LIF/STE
- Website: www.hochstadt-main.de

Hochstadt am Main (German pronunciation: [ˈhoːxʃtat ʔam ˈmaɪn], lit. 'Hochstadt on the Main') is a municipality in the district of Lichtenfels in Bavaria in Germany. It lies on the river Main.
