= Weismain (river) =

River in Germany

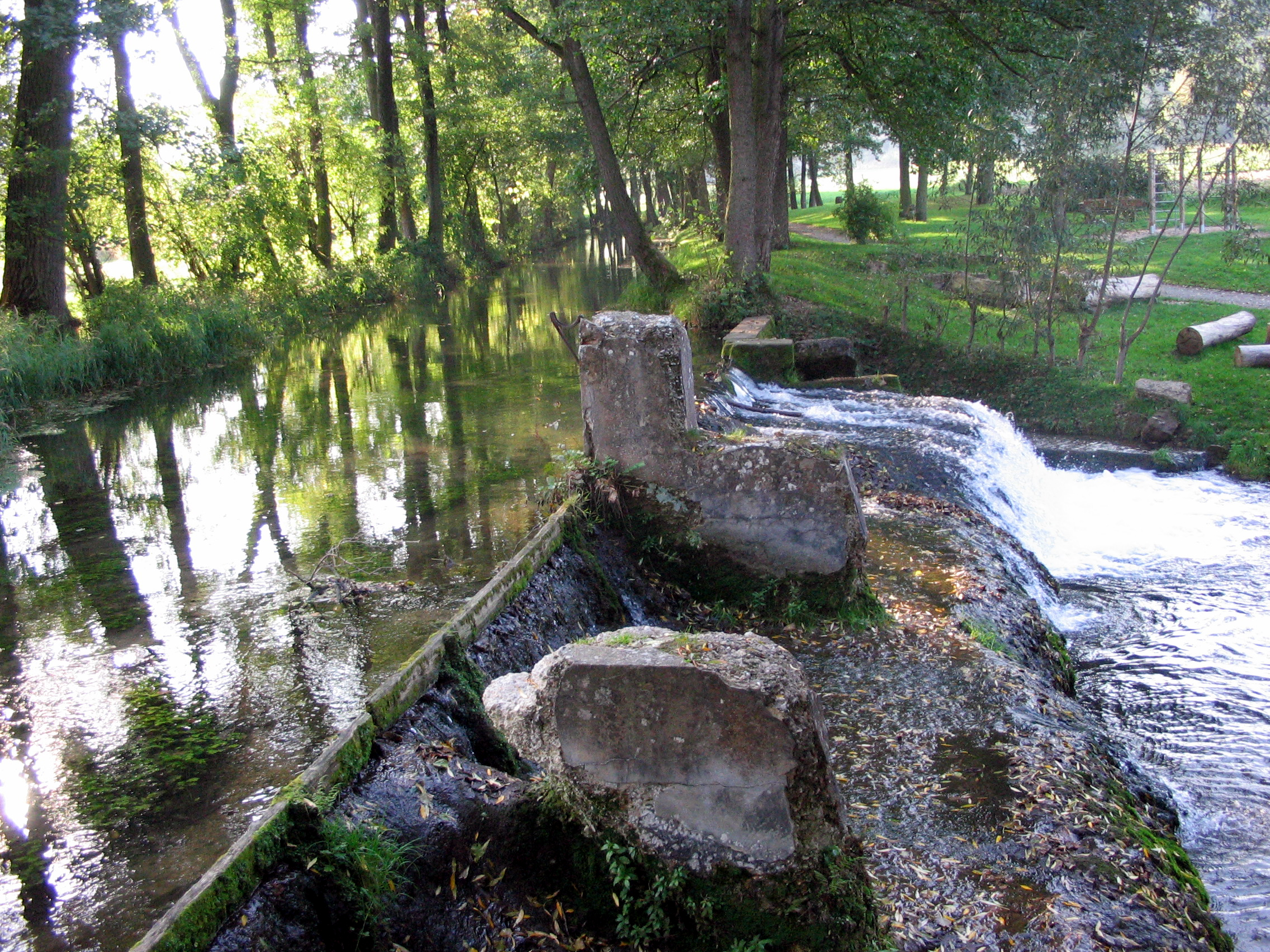

Location
- Country: Germany
- State: Bavaria

Physical characteristics
- Mouth
  - location: Main
  - coordinates: 50.1305°N 11.2530°E
- Length: 17.8 km (11.1 mi)

Basin features
- Progression: Main→ Rhine→ North Sea

The Weismain (with German article die Weismain) is a river in Upper Franconia, Bavaria, Germany. With about 18 km (11 mi) length, it is a left tributary of the Main near Altenkunstadt. It flows through the town Weismain.

In the Middle Ages and the early modern period, the Weismain was an important body of water for the operation of mills.

== See also ==
- List of rivers of Bavaria
