= Loam =

Soil composed of similar proportions of sand and silt, and somewhat less clay

Soil types by clay, silt and sand composition as used by the United States Department of Agriculture

Loam (in geology and soil science) is soil composed mostly of sand (particle size > 63 μm), silt (particle size > 2 μm), and a smaller amount of clay (particle size < 2 μm). By weight, its mineral composition is about 40–40–20% concentration of sand, silt and clay, respectively. These proportions can vary to a degree, however, and result in different types of loam soils: sandy loam, silty loam, clay loam, sandy clay loam, silty clay loam, and loam.

In the United States Department of Agriculture, textural classification triangle, the only soil that is not predominantly sand, silt, or clay is called "loam". Loam soils generally contain more nutrients, moisture, and humus than sandy soils, have better drainage and infiltration of water and air than silt- and clay-rich soils, and are easier to till than clay soils. In fact, the primary definition of loam in most dictionaries is soils containing humus (organic content) with no mention of particle size or texture, and this definition is used by many gardeners. The different types of loam soils each have slightly different characteristics, with some draining liquids more efficiently than others. The soil's texture, especially its ability to retain nutrients and water, are crucial. Loam soil is suitable for growing most plant varieties.

Bricks made of loam, mud, sand, and water, with an added binding material such as rice husks or straw, have been used in construction since ancient times.

== Classifications ==
Loam soils can be classified into more specific subtypes. Some examples are sandy loam, silt loam, clay loam, and silty clay loam. Different soil phases have some variation in characteristics like stoniness and erosion that are too minor to affect native vegetative growth but can be significant for crop cultivation.

== Use in farming ==
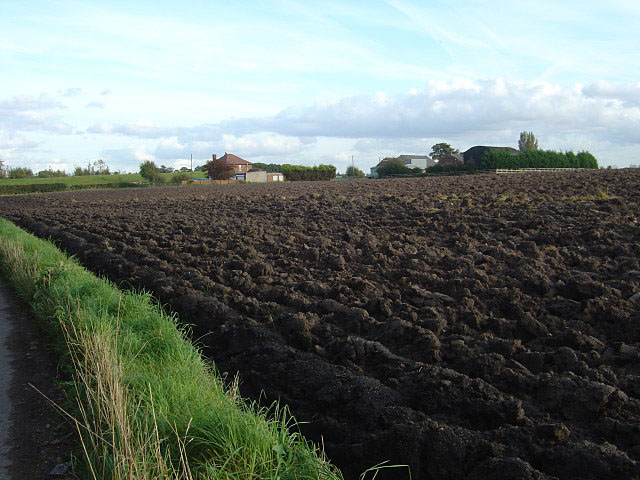
Fine, loam-rich field ideal for farming vegetables in the UK

Loam is considered ideal for gardening and agricultural uses because it retains nutrients well and retains water while still allowing excess water to drain away. A soil dominated by one or two of the three particle size groups can behave like loam if it has a strong granular structure, promoted by a high content of organic matter. However, a soil that meets the textural (geological) definition of loam can lose its characteristic desirable qualities when it is compacted, depleted of organic matter, or has clay dispersed throughout its fine-earth fraction.

For example, pea can be cultivated in sandy loam and clay loam soils, but not more compacted sandy soils.

== Use in house construction ==
Loam is traditionally widely used for the construction of houses, for example in loam post and beam construction. Other techniques include rammed earth and adobe (unfired loam bricks). Loam is well known for its capability to control air humidity. In countries with a high temperature like Morocco, thick walls built with loam help to keep the houses cool.

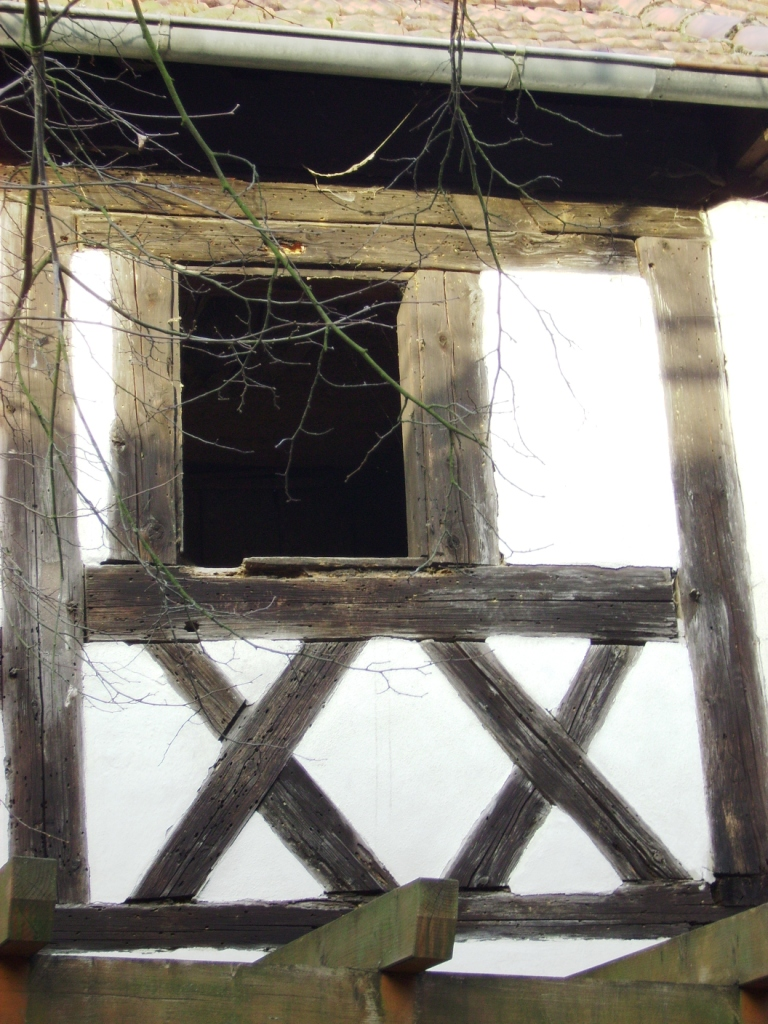
Loam with timber framing (Michelau in Oberfranken, Germany, 2007)

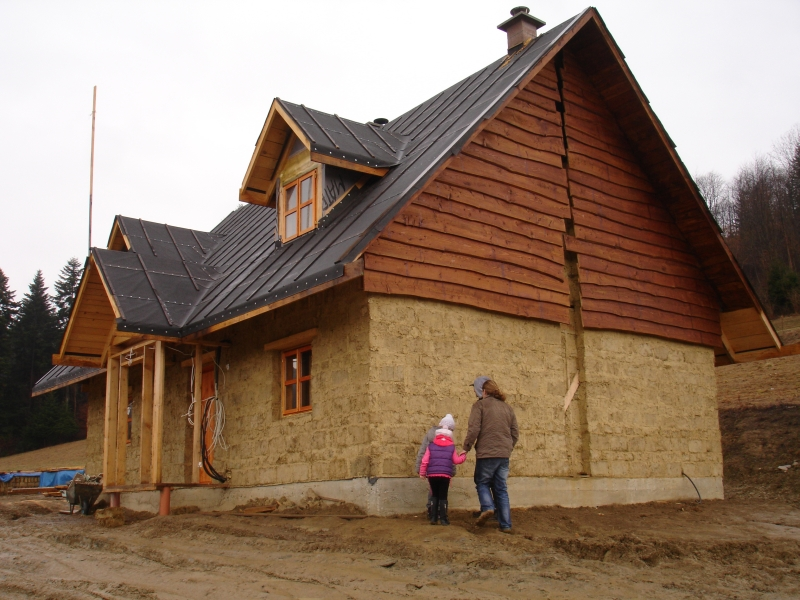
House with loam ground floor (Baligród, Poland, 2012)

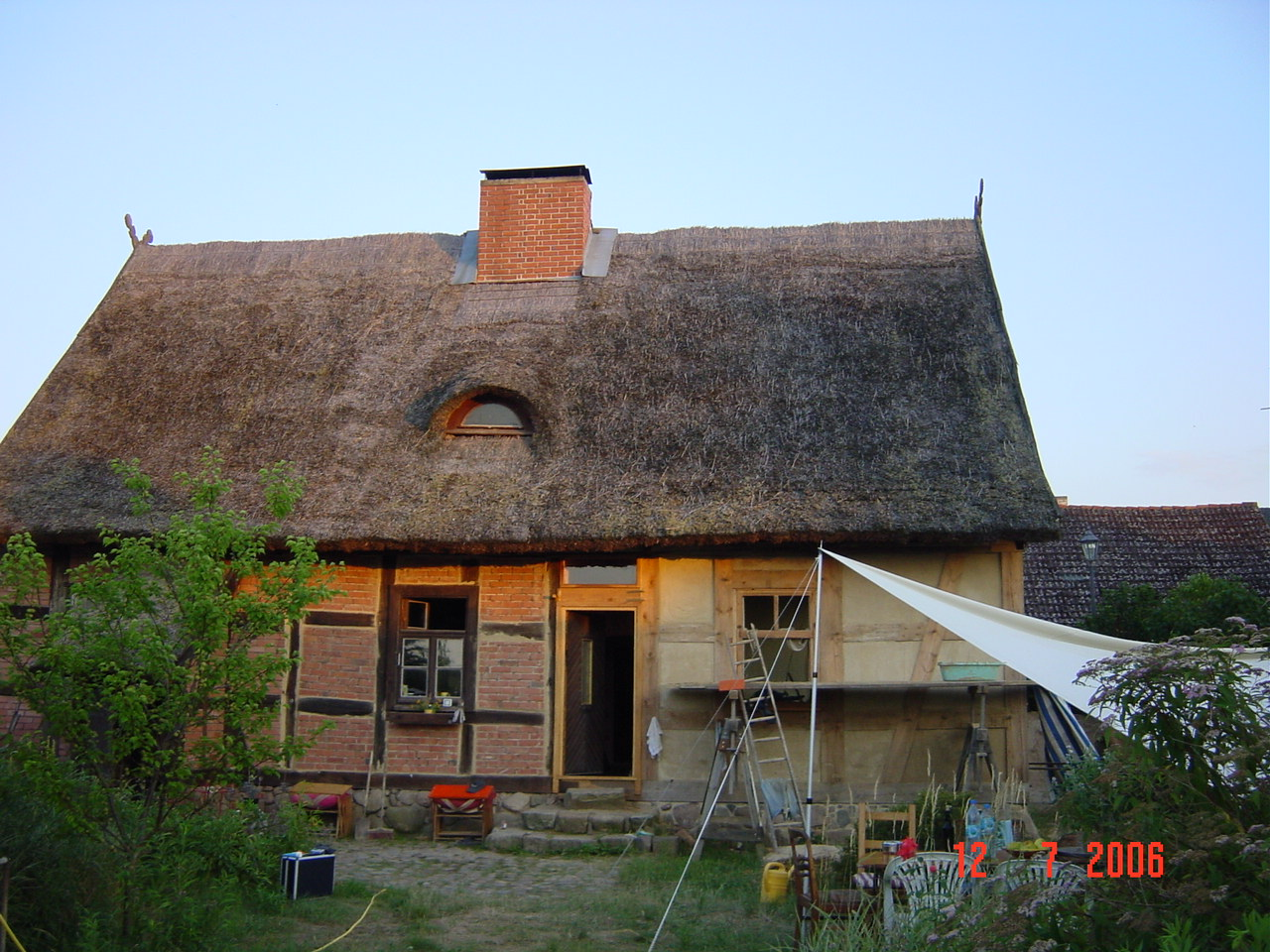
Loam-timber-framed 1707 house, under restoration (Biesenthal, Germany, 2006)

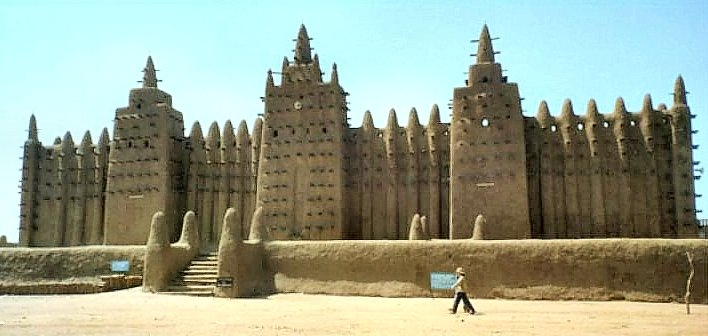
Great Mosque of Djenné (Mali, 2004)

== See also ==
- Loess – Sediment of accumulated wind-blown dust
- Grain size – Diameter of individual grains of sediment, or of lithified particles in clastic rocks
- Soil texture – Property of a soil
