= Marktgraitz =

- Municipality
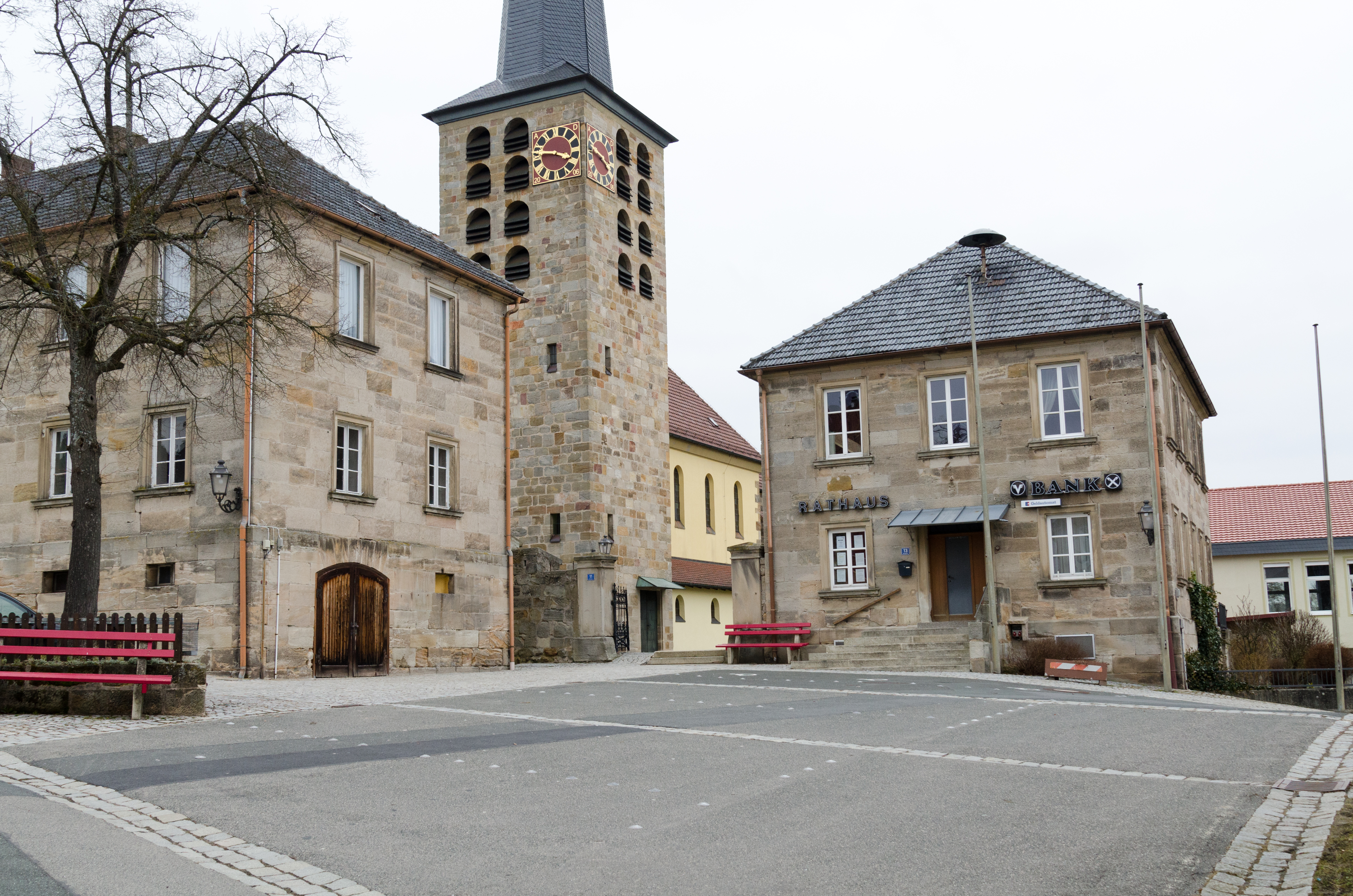
- Church of the Holy Trinity and the town hall

- Coat of arms

- Location of Marktgraitz within Lichtenfels district
- Interactive map of Marktgraitz
- Location within Germany Location within Bavaria
- Coordinates: 50°10′N 11°11′E
- Country: Germany
- State: Bavaria
- Admin. region: Oberfranken
- District: Lichtenfels
- Municipal assoc.: Redwitz an der Rodach

Government
  - Mayor (2020–26): Jochen Partheymüller

Area
  - Total: 3.75 km^{2} (1.45 sq mi)
- Elevation: 292 m (958 ft)

Population (2025-12-31)
  - Total: 1,104
  - Density: 294/km^{2} (762/sq mi)
- Time zone: UTC+01:00 (CET)
  - Summer (DST): UTC+02:00 (CEST)
- Postal codes: 96257
- Dialling codes: 09574
- Vehicle registration: LIF
- Website: www.marktgraitz.de

Marktgraitz (German pronunciation: [maʁktˈɡʁaɪts]) is a municipality in the district of Lichtenfels in Bavaria in Germany.
