= Hochstadt-Marktzeuln =

- Verwaltungsgemeinschaft
- Location of Hochstadt-Marktzeuln within Lichtenfels district
- Interactive map of Hochstadt-Marktzeuln
- Location within Germany Location within Bavaria
- Coordinates: 50°10′N 11°10′E
- Country: Germany
- State: Bavaria
- Admin. region: Upper Franconia
- District: Lichtenfels
- Seat: Marktzeuln
- Subdivisions: 2 municipalities

Area
  - Total: 20.64 km^{2} (7.97 sq mi)

Population (2025-12-31)
  - Total: 3,162
  - Density: 153.2/km^{2} (396.8/sq mi)
- Time zone: UTC+01:00 (CET)
  - Summer (DST): UTC+02:00 (CEST)
- Website: www.vg-hochstadt-marktzeuln.de

Hochstadt-Marktzeuln is a Verwaltungsgemeinschaft (municipal association) in the district of Lichtenfels in Bavaria, Germany. Its seat is in Marktzeuln.

It consists of the following municipalities:

1. Hochstadt am Main
2. Marktzeuln
