= Yaakov Koppel Altenkunshtadt =

Rabbi Yaakov Koppel Altenkunshtadt
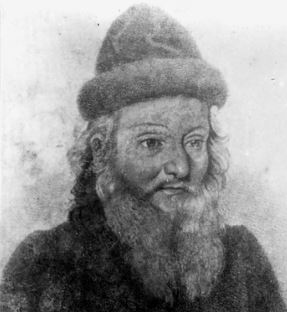

Personal life
- Born: 1765 Altenkunstadt, Prince-Bishopric of Bamberg, Holy Roman Empire
- Died: 19 December 1837 (aged 71–72) Verbau, Austrian Empire
- Spouse: Raizel Pessels
- Parent: Tzvi Hirsh Altenkunshtadt (father)
- Occupation: Rabbi

Religious life
- Religion: Judaism
- Denomination: Orthodox

Rabbi Yaakov Koppel Altenkunshtadt (1765 – 1837), also known as Reb Koppel Charif, ("sharp" (Hebrew: חריף) was one of the leading Orthodox rabbis of Hungary in the first half of the nineteenth century. A peer of Moses Sofer of Pressburg, Koppel Charif presided over the largest and most prestigious yeshiva in Hungary.

== Early years ==
He was born in 1765 within the city of Altenkunstadt, at the time located within the Prince-Bishopric of Bamberg in the Holy Roman Empire. Yaakov was the son of the scholar Tzvi Hirsh Altenkunshtadt.

In 1781 he went to study under Yechezkel Landau of Prague, author of Noda biYehudah. During his time in Fiurda, his parents died.

He lived in Prague from 1783 to 1786. In 1786 he became engaged to Raizel Pessels, the daughter of the scholar and merchant Avrohom Pessels of Stomfa, today Stupava, Slovakia. They were married in 1788.

He studied in Stomfa for a few months, before becoming the rabbi in Karlburg in 1789. In 1791, he became rabbi of Verbau in modern-day Slovakia.

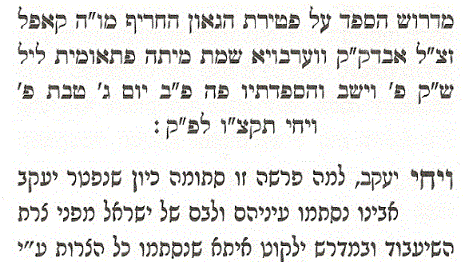
Beginning of eulogy of Koppel Charif by Moshe Sofer

Altenkunshtadt was rabbi of Verbau for 45 years. His yeshiva usually held around 150 students at a time.

He died on 19 December 1837.

== Other reading ==
- C. (Yaakov Koppel) Duschinsky, Toldos Yaakov, The life and times of the Gaon Rebbi Koppel Charif of blessed and righteous memory (London: Rephoel Mazin and partners, 1918) in Hebrew. Copyright 2018 in English. Duschinsky, Yaakov Koppel. Translated by Dovid Honig. Toldos Yaakov, The Life and Times of the Gaon Rav Koppel Charif (Jerusalem: Torah Im Derech Eretz Society, 2018).
- Rav Shlomo Zalman Sonnenfeld, Guardian of Jerusalem (Brooklyn, NY: Mesorah Publications, 1983).
