= Marktzeuln =

- Municipality
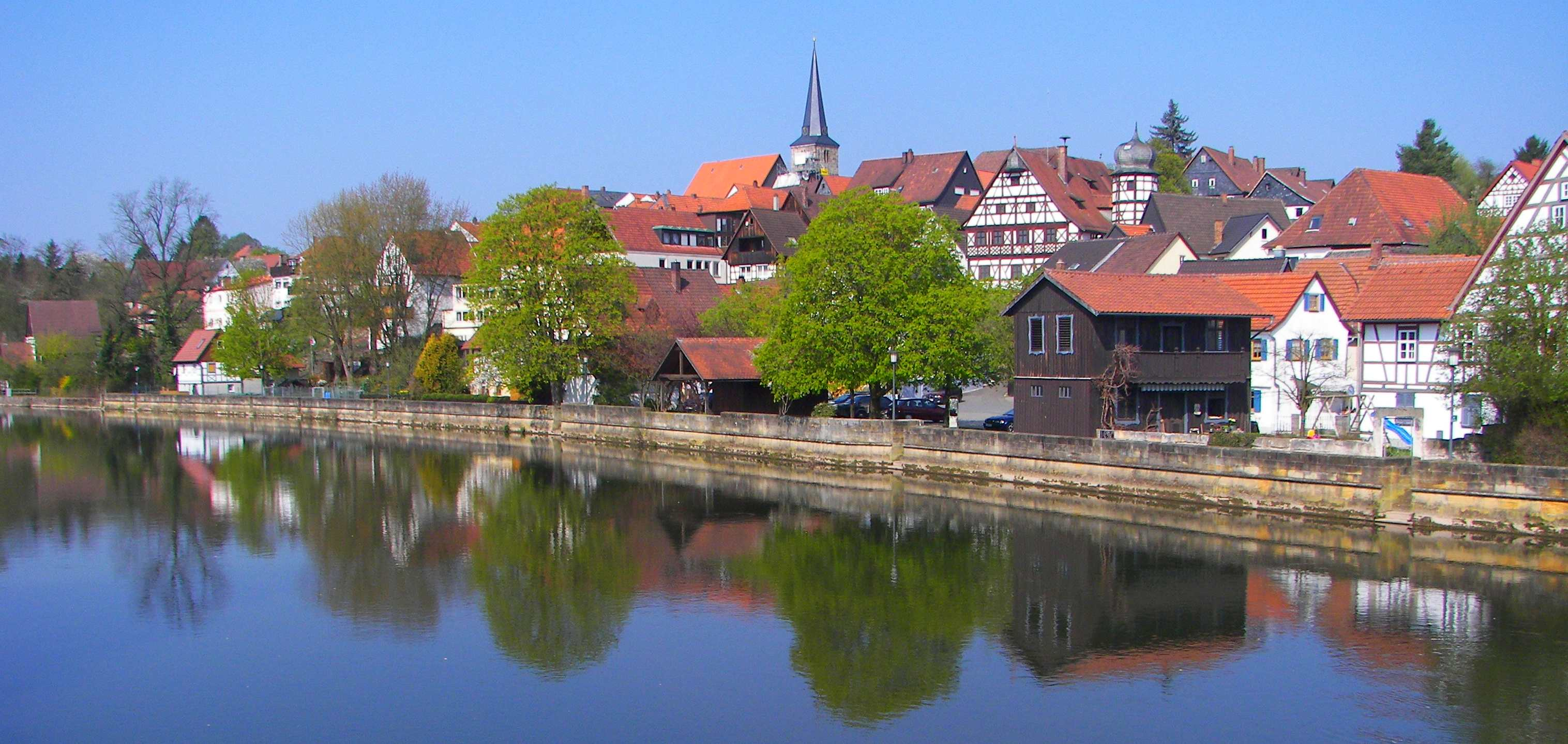
- Marktzeuln seen over the Rodach River

- Coat of arms

- Location of Marktzeuln within Lichtenfels district
- Interactive map of Marktzeuln
- Location within Germany Location within Bavaria
- Coordinates: 50°10′N 11°11′E
- Country: Germany
- State: Bavaria
- Admin. region: Oberfranken
- District: Lichtenfels
- Municipal assoc.: Hochstadt-Marktzeuln
- Subdivisions: 3 Ortsteile

Government
  - Mayor (2020–26): Gregor Friedlein-Zech

Area
  - Total: 6.86 km^{2} (2.65 sq mi)
- Elevation: 292 m (958 ft)

Population (2025-12-31)
  - Total: 1,602
  - Density: 234/km^{2} (605/sq mi)
- Time zone: UTC+01:00 (CET)
  - Summer (DST): UTC+02:00 (CEST)
- Postal codes: 96275
- Dialling codes: 09574
- Vehicle registration: LIF
- Website: www.marktzeuln.de

Marktzeuln (German pronunciation: [maʁktˈtsɔʏln]) is a municipality in the district of Lichtenfels in Bavaria in Germany. It lies on the river Rodach.
