= Michelau in Oberfranken =

- Municipality
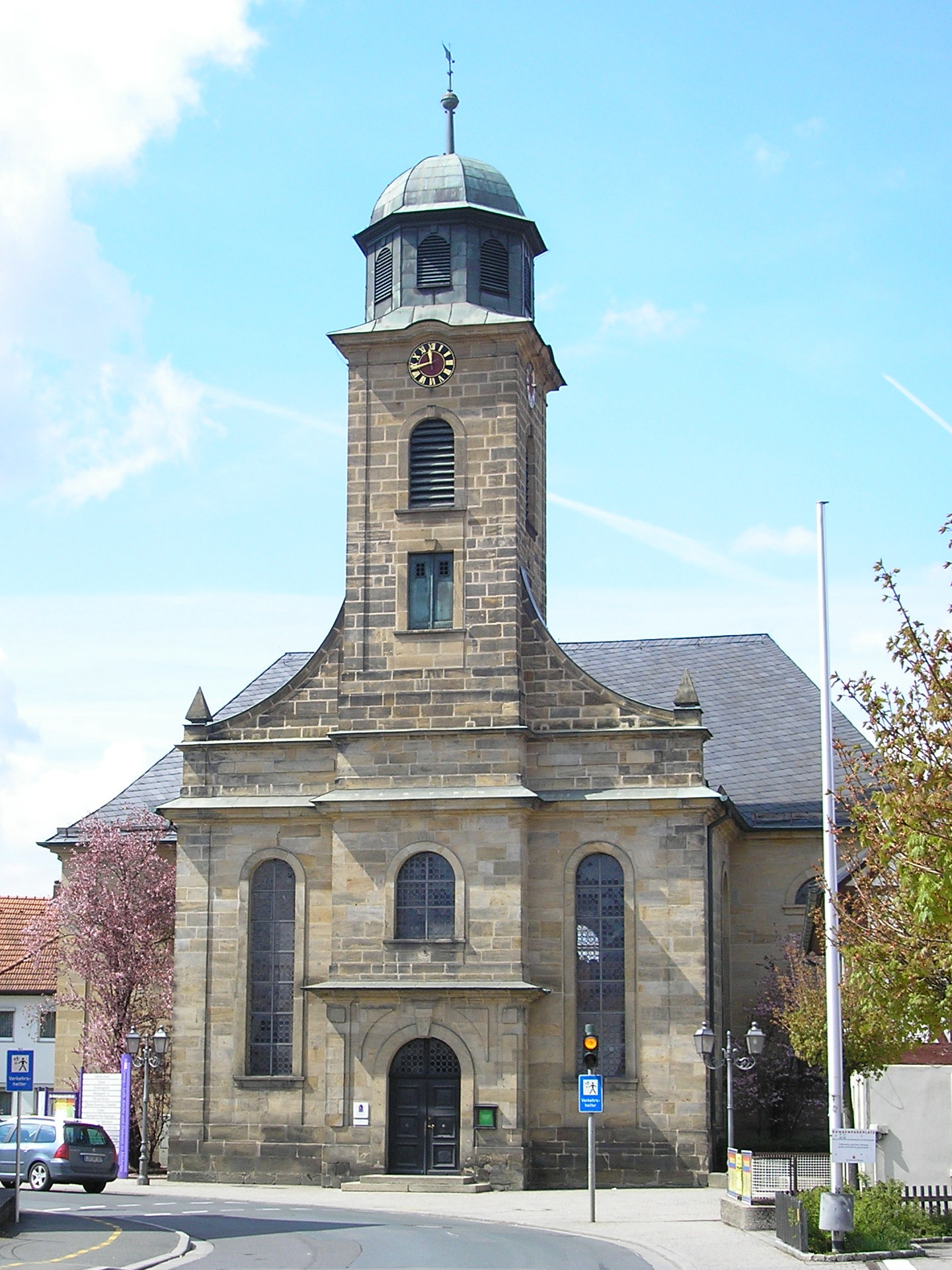
- Lutheran Church of Saint John

- Coat of arms

- Location of Michelau in Oberfranken within Lichtenfels district
- Interactive map of Michelau in Oberfranken
- Location within Germany Location within Bavaria
- Coordinates: 50°10′N 11°7′E
- Country: Germany
- State: Bavaria
- Admin. region: Upper Franconia
- District: Lichtenfels
- Subdivisions: 5 Gemeindeteile

Government
  - Mayor (2021–27): Jochen Weber (CSU)

Area
  - Total: 19.35 km^{2} (7.47 sq mi)
- Elevation: 266 m (873 ft)

Population (2025-12-31)
  - Total: 6,042
  - Density: 312.2/km^{2} (808.7/sq mi)
- Time zone: UTC+01:00 (CET)
  - Summer (DST): UTC+02:00 (CEST)
- Postal codes: 96247
- Dialling codes: 09571 09574
- Vehicle registration: LIF
- Website: www.gemeinde-michelau.de

Michelau in Oberfranken (German pronunciation: [ˈmɪçəlaʊ ʔɪn ˈʔoːbɐˌfʁaŋkn̩], lit. 'Michelau in Upper Franconia') is a municipality in the district of Lichtenfels in Bavaria in Germany.

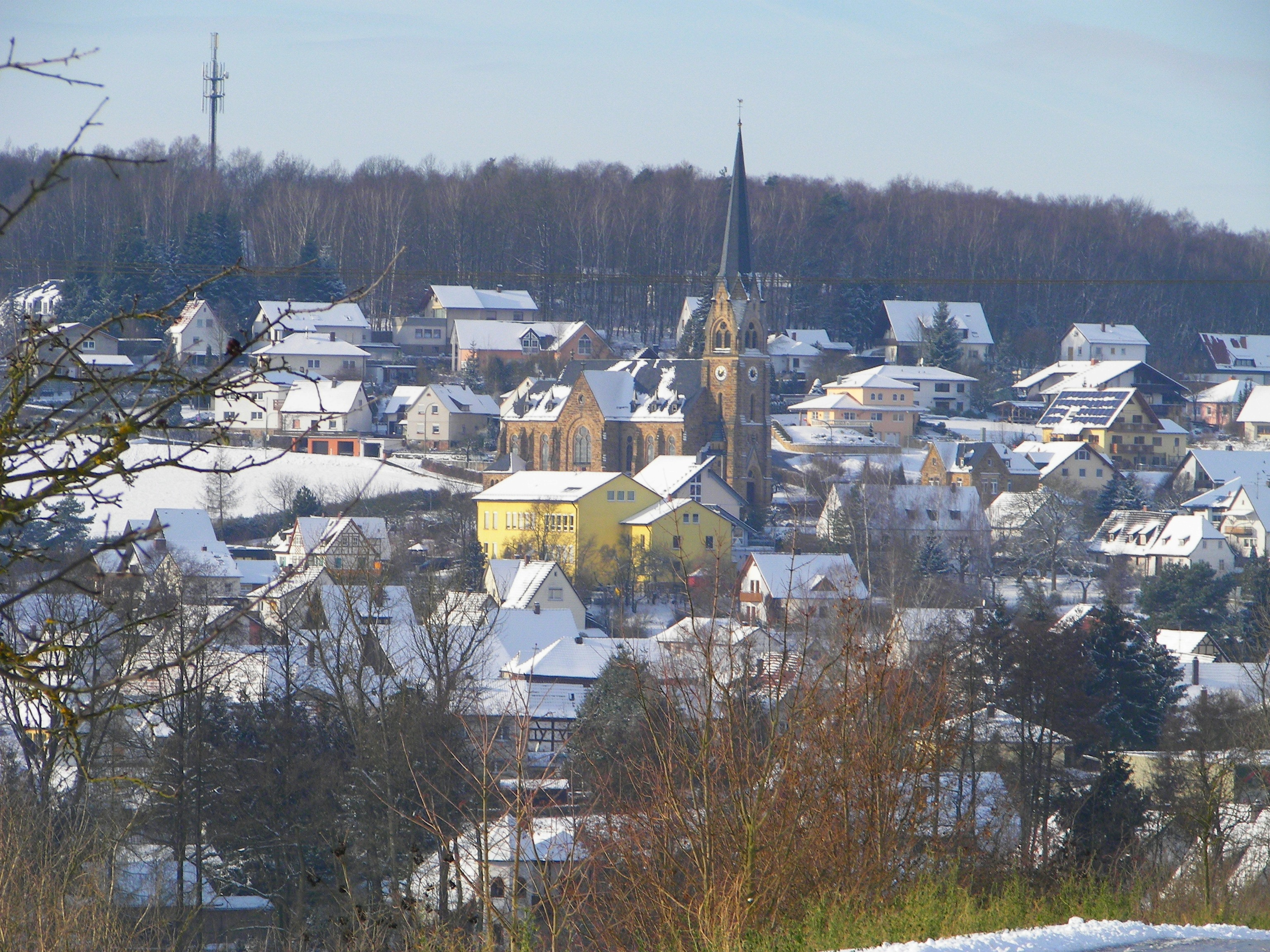
District of Schwürbitz with the Church of Sacred Heart

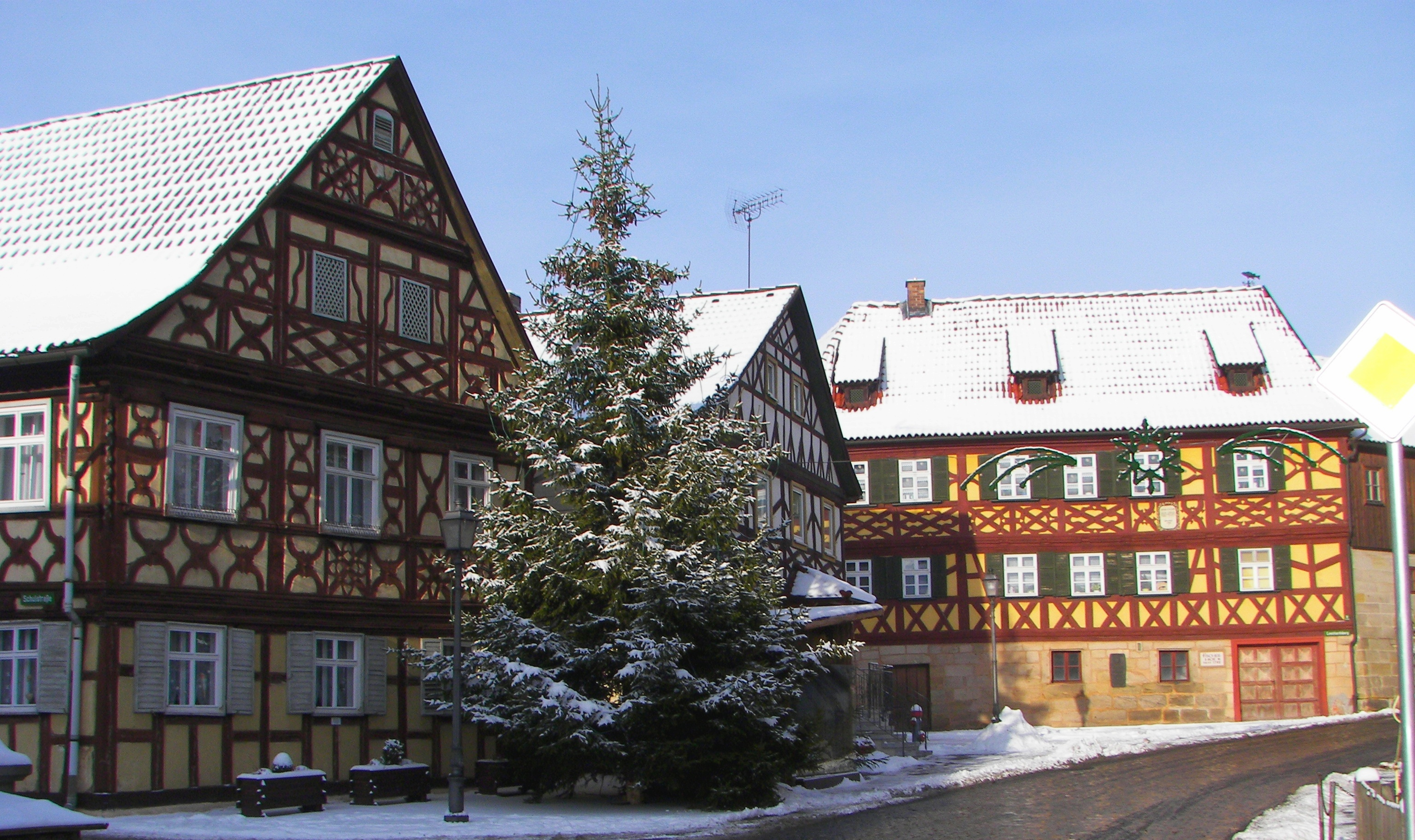
Fischerhof

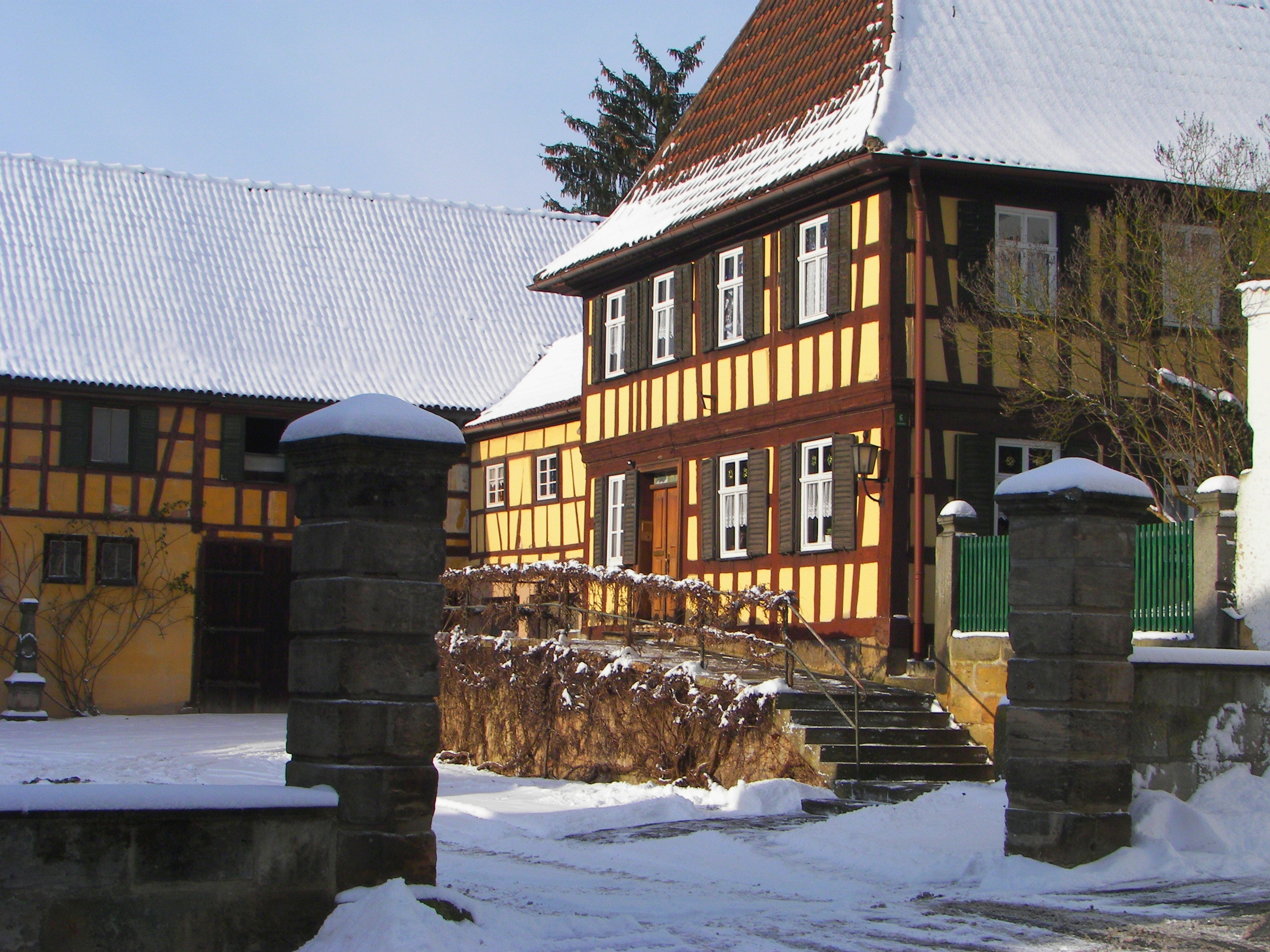
Fischerhof
