= Christian Meißner =

German politician (born 1969)

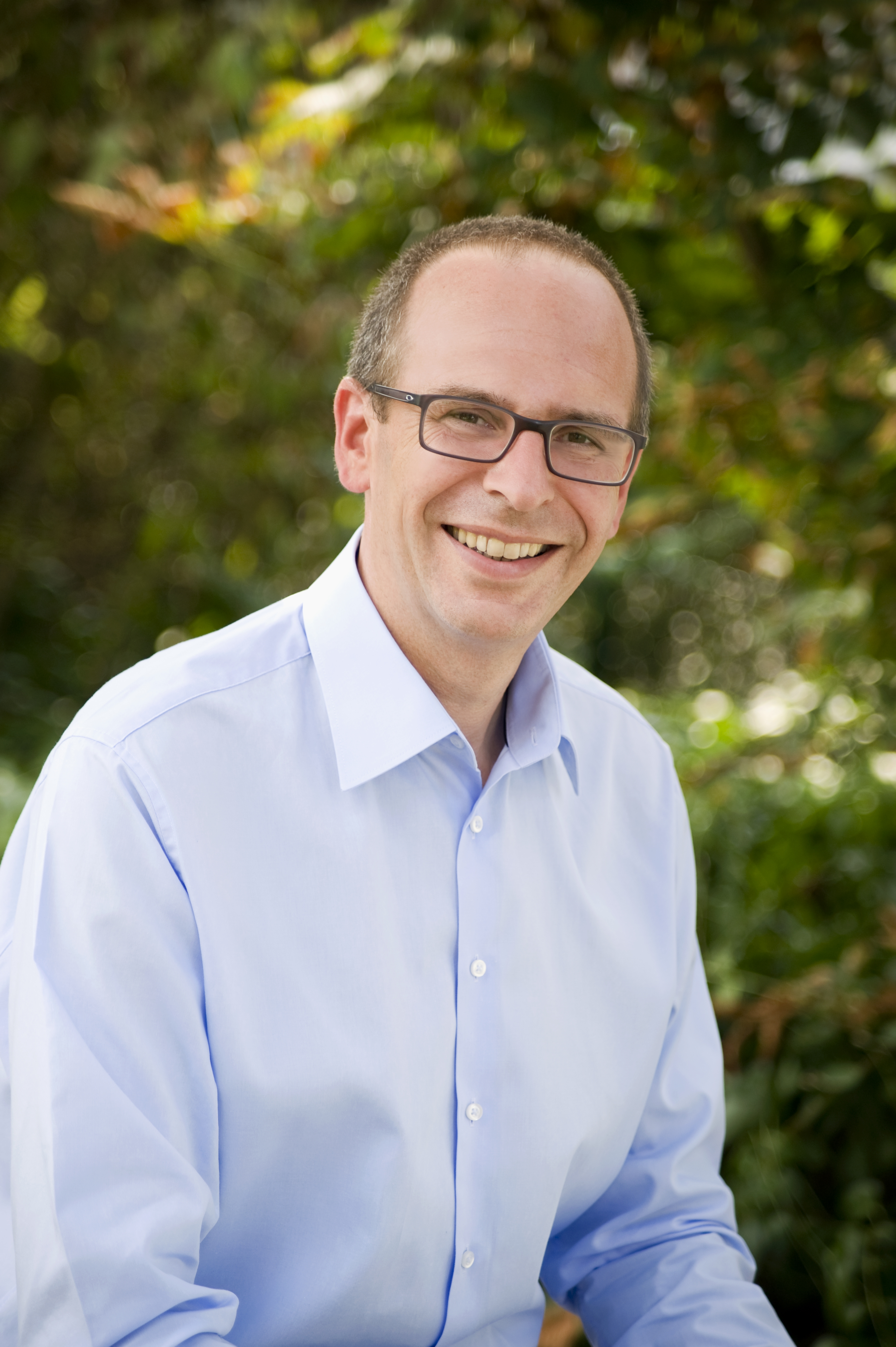
- Meißner in 2016

Member of the Landtag of Bavaria
- In office 28 September 1998 – 14 December 2011
- Preceded by: Walter Grossmann
- Succeeded by: Ludwig von Lerchenfeld
- Constituency: Lichtenfels (1998–2003); Kronach, Lichtenfels (2003–2011)

Personal details
- Born: 18 December 1969 (age 56) Kronach
- Party: Christian Social Union (since 1986)

Christian Meißner (born 18 December 1969 in Kronach) is a German politician serving as Landrat of Lichtenfels since 2011. From 1998 to 2011, he was a member of the Landtag of Bavaria.
