= Wiesen (Bad Staffelstein) =

- Part of Bad Staffelstein
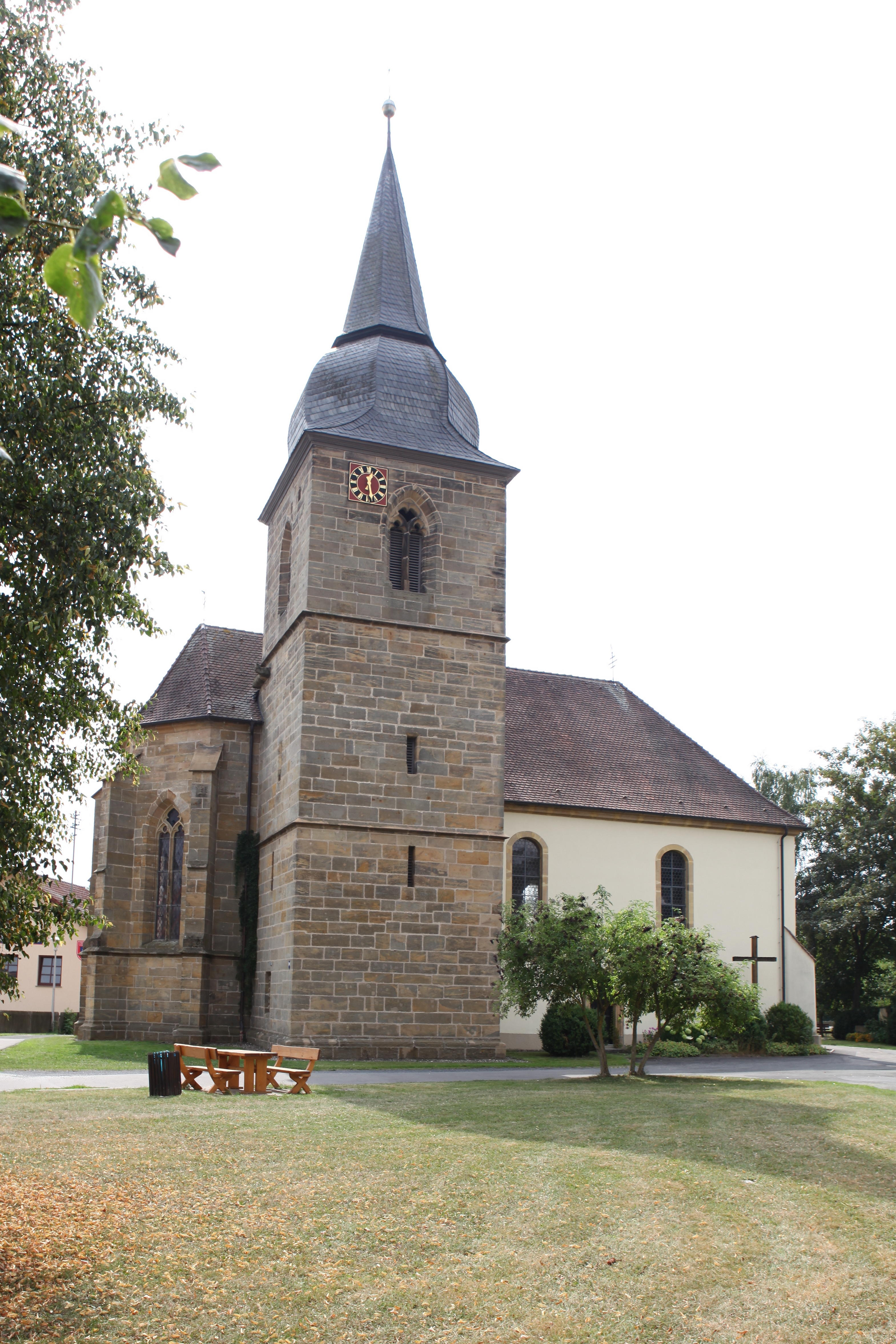
- Church of Saint Andrew
- Interactive map of Wiesen
- Location within Germany Location within Bavaria
- Coordinates: 50°05′N 10°57′E
- Country: Germany
- State: Bavaria
- District: Lichtenfels
- Town: Bad Staffelstein

Population
  - Total: 284
- Time zone: UTC+01:00 (CET)
  - Summer (DST): UTC+02:00 (CEST)
- Postal codes: 96231
- Dialling codes: 09573
- Vehicle registration: LIF
- Website: www.wiesen-dorf.de

Wiesen (German pronunciation: [ˈviːzn̩]) is a borough of Bad Staffelstein in Germany.

Wiesen lies 4.5 km (2.8 mi) away from town on the north bank of the river Main. The borough has 290 residents, 110 guest beds, and 2 Inn-Breweries. In 1998, the village at the foot of the Eierberge placed among the 23 most beautiful boroughs in Bavaria in the "Unser Dorf soll schöner werden – Unser Dorf hat Zukunft" Contest.
