= Bad Staffelstein =

- Town
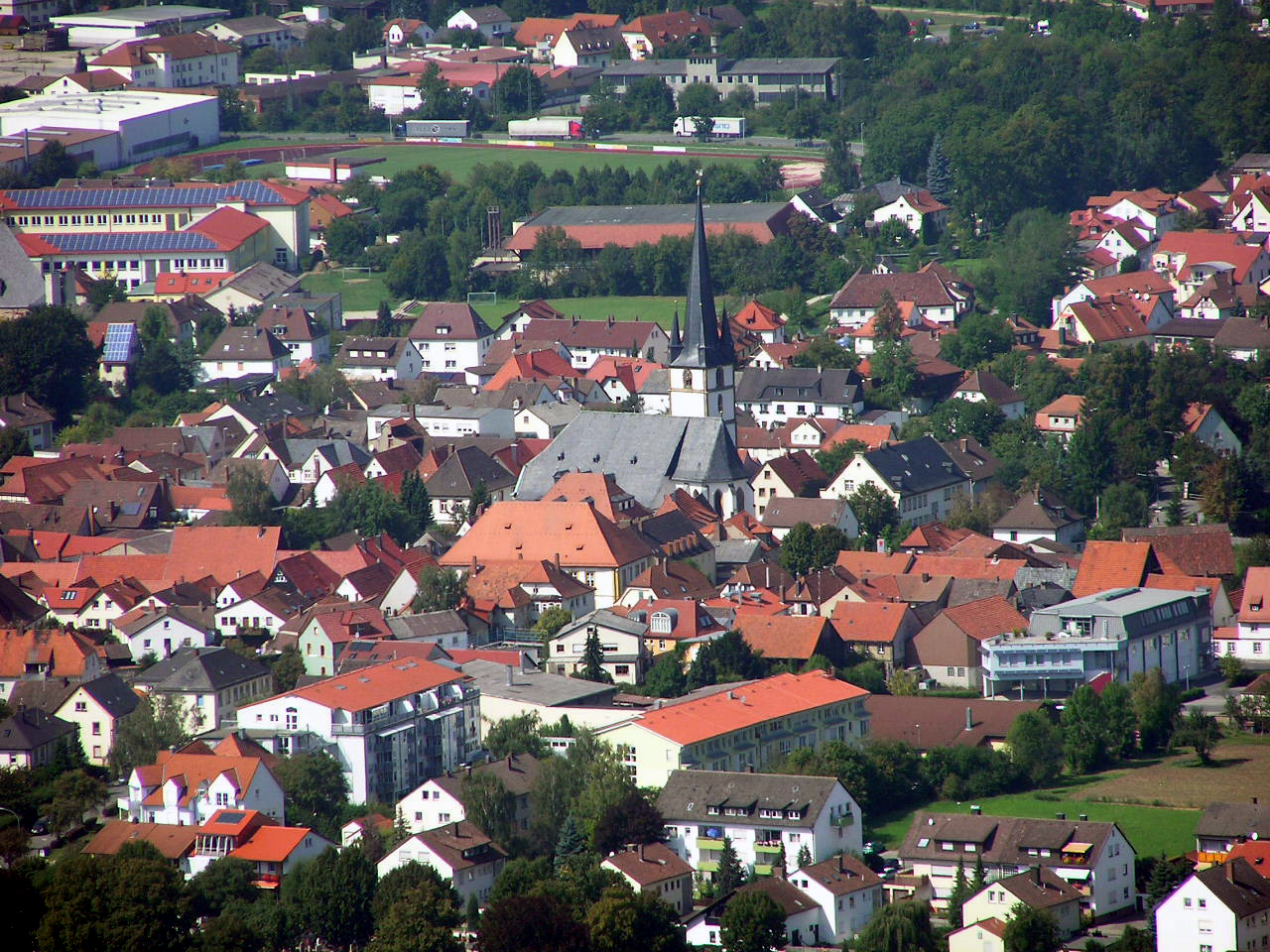
- Bad Staffelstein as seen from Staffelberg

- Coat of arms

- Location of Bad Staffelstein within Lichtenfels district
- Interactive map of Bad Staffelstein
- Location within Germany Location within Bavaria
- Coordinates: 50°06′N 10°58′E
- Country: Germany
- State: Bavaria
- Admin. region: Oberfranken
- District: Lichtenfels
- Subdivisions: 20 Ortsteile

Government
  - Mayor (2021–27): Mario Schönwald (FW)

Area
  - Total: 99.52 km^{2} (38.42 sq mi)
- Elevation: 274 m (899 ft)

Population (2025-12-31)
  - Total: 10,731
  - Density: 107.8/km^{2} (279.3/sq mi)
- Time zone: UTC+01:00 (CET)
  - Summer (DST): UTC+02:00 (CEST)
- Postal codes: 96231
- Dialling codes: 09573
- Vehicle registration: LIF, STE
- Website: www.bad-staffelstein.de

Bad Staffelstein (German pronunciation: [baːt ˈʃtafl̩ˌʃtaɪn]) is a town in the Bavarian Administrative Region of Upper Franconia in Germany. It has around 10,000 inhabitants.

Bad Staffelstein is known for several landmarks, such as the Basilica of the Vierzehnheiligen designed by Balthasar Neumann, the former monastery of Banz Abbey, now Banz Castle, and the 540 meter high Staffelberg. Most recently, it has been the thermal salt water spa, for which the town received the title Bad (spa) in 2001, that has made Staffelstein a tourist attraction.

== Geography ==
=== Location ===
The municipal territory of Bad Staffelstein extends on both banks of the Main river. It is located northeast of Bamberg in the district of Lichtenfels.

=== Subdivisions ===
Bad Staffelstein consists of the following Stadtteile:

- Altenbanz
- End
- Frauendorf
- Grundfeld
- Gößmitz
- Hausen
- Horsdorf
- Kaider
- Krögelhof
- Kümmersreuth
- Loffeld
- Nedensdorf
- Neubanz
- Püchitz
- Romansthal
- Schönbrunn
- Schwabthal
- Serkendorf
- Stadel
- Stublang
- Unnersdorf
- Unterzettlitz
- Uetzing
- Basilica of the Vierzehnheiligen
- Weisbrem
- Wiesen
- Wolfsdorf
- Zilgendorf

== History ==
Staffelstein was first mentioned around 800 and received its town status in 1130.

In 1846, with the construction of the Ludwig South-North Railway, the town was connected to the Bavarian rail network.

The status of spa was awarded in 2001.

=== Stadtteile (quarters) ===
==== Kaider ====
Kaider is known for its stone industry, as well as for St. Mary's Chapel.

Kaider was earlier known as Dabermannsdorf; the change to the name Kaider has been proven to have taken place no later than 1542.

Kaider was first mentioned on 12 December 1299. On that day, Albert von Giech, knight of Bamberg, sold with the agreement of his wife Elisabeth and his brother Kunimund, a canon of Bamberg Cathedral, all of his lands in Nuweseze (Neuses am Main), Obristfeld, and Dabermannsdorf (now Kaider) to Langheim Abbey. The selling price was 126 Pfund Bamberg Denars.

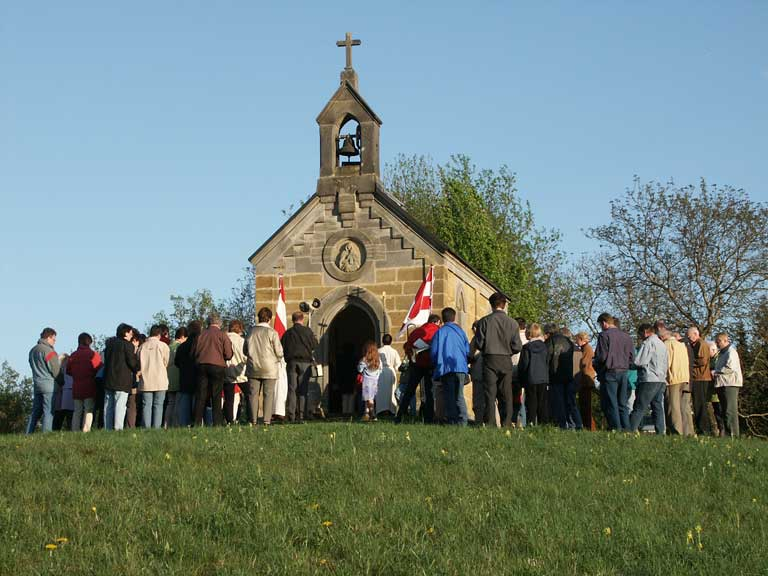
May Devotions at St. Mary's Chapel in Kaider

==== Schwabthal ====
Schwabthal lies 7 km east of Bad Staffelstein and has around 200 residents.

=== Incorporation ===
The District Reform of 1972 brought many changes to Staffelstein. Except for the District Office all other central administrations were dissolved. With the Municipal Territory Reform in 1978, the loss of administrative power and centrality became more balanced.

== Demographics ==
- 1900: 1,724
- 1977: 4,985 (before the Municipal Territory Reform)
- 1978: 9,881 (after the Municipal Territory Reform)

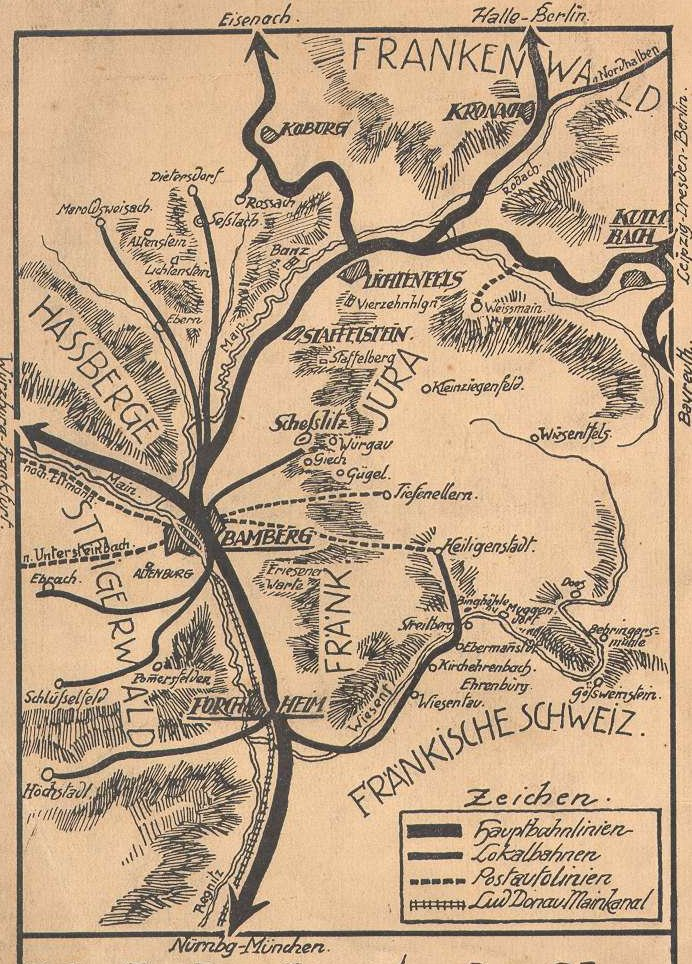
Upper Franconia road map from 1912 with Staffelstein

== Culture and landmarks ==
=== Museums ===
- Museum of the town of Bad Staffelstein
- Fossil Collection at Banz Castle

=== Buildings ===
On 5 July 1684, a fire destroyed almost the entire town center. Therefore, most houses in Staffelstein today date from after the fire.

- The town hall (built from 1684 to 1687), is a three-story Franconian half-timbered house and dominates the town's market square.
- The Bamberg Tower (commonly referred to as the Stadtturm) is the only remaining tower from the town fortifications. For some time, it has been used to exhibit art.
- Banz Abbey and castle
- Basilica of the Vierzehnheiligen

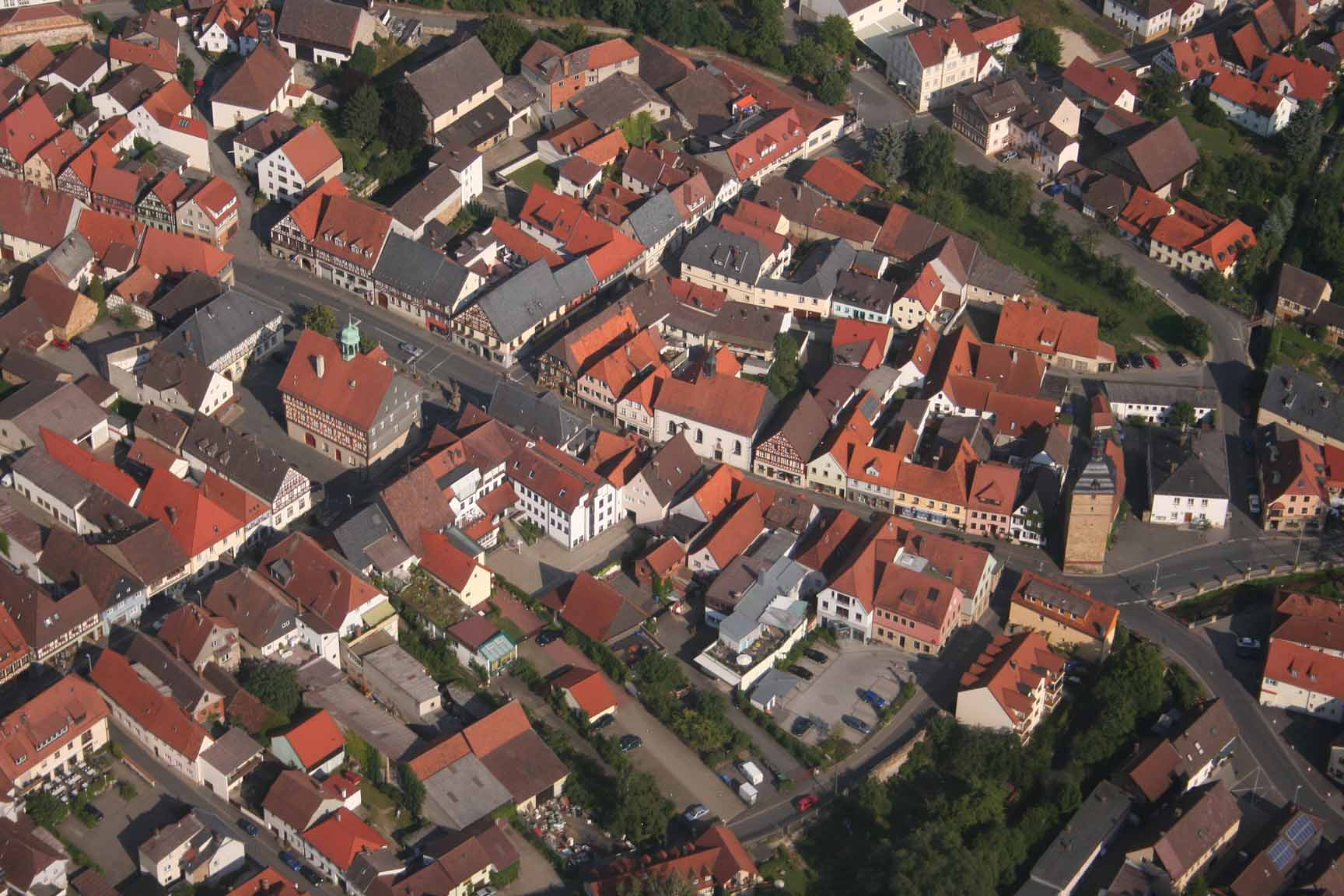
Aerial photo of the town center, with the old town hall and the Stadtturm

=== Regular Events ===
- Staffelsteiner Autofrühling (March)
- Songs an einem Sommerabend (July)
- Altstadtfest (End of July)
- Beerbrewerfest (Assumption of Mary, 15 August)
- Obermain-Marathon (April)

== Sports ==
- TSV 1860 Staffelstein

== Notable people ==
- Adam Riese (1492–1559), mathematician

His arithmetic books were used for instruction in schools well into the 18th century. Even today, one hears the German expression "Das macht nach Adam Ries(e)..." ("According to Adam Ries, that gives us...").

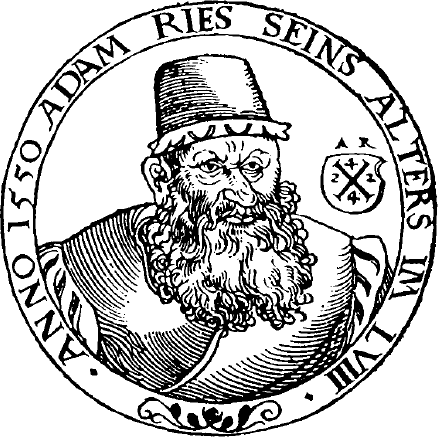
Adam Riese around 1550

- Peter Zillig (1855–1929), teacher and educational writer
- Hubert Weber (1920–2013), painter and sculptor
