= Wiesen (surname) =

Wiesen is a German language habitational surname. Notable people with the name include:

- Jonas Wiesen (1996), German coxswain
- Jonathan Wiesen, American history professor
