= Mountain aster =

Mountain aster is a common name for several plants in the aster family and may refer to:

- Canadanthus
- Eurybia chlorolepis, native to the southeastern United States
