= Lichtenfels (district) =

Coordinates: 50°10′N 11°05′E

- District
- Flag Coat of arms
- Country: Germany
- State: Bavaria
- Adm. region: Upper Franconia
- Capital: Lichtenfels

Government
  - District admin.: Christian Meißner (CSU)

Area
  - Total: 552 km^{2} (213 sq mi)

Population (31 December 2025)
  - Total: 67,114
  - Density: 122/km^{2} (315/sq mi)
- Time zone: UTC+01:00 (CET)
  - Summer (DST): UTC+02:00 (CEST)
- Vehicle registration: LIF, STE
- Website: landkreis-lichtenfels.de

Lichtenfels is a Landkreis (district) in Bavaria, Germany. It is bounded by (from the north and clockwise) the districts of Coburg, Kronach, Kulmbach, Bayreuth and Bamberg.

== History ==
In medieval times the Main river served as the border between the two main states possessing lands in this territory: the Bishopric of Bamberg, and the County of Andechs. The castle of Lichtenfels was property of Andechs, which later fell under the Duchy of Merania. In 1248 the Dukes of Merania became extinct, and the entire region was annexed by the clerical state of Bamberg. In 1803 the clerical states of Germany were dissolved, and the Bishopric of Bamberg fell to Bavaria.

The district was established in 1972 by merging the former districts of Lichtenfels and Staffelstein.

== Geography ==
The district is situated on both banks of the river Main in the hills of the Franconian Jura (Fränkische Alb).

== Coat of arms ==
Yellow and blue were the colours of Andechs resp. Merania. The bishopric of Bamberg is symbolised by the heraldic lion of Bamberg. On the left side there are the orb and the crown of the Holy Roman Empire.

== Towns and municipalities ==
Clickable map of towns and municipalities in the district

Towns
1. Bad Staffelstein
2. Burgkunstadt
3. Lichtenfels
4. Weismain
Märkte
1. Ebensfeld
Municipalities
1. Altenkunstadt
2. Michelau in Oberfranken

Verwaltungsgemeinschaften
1. Hochstadt-Marktzeuln; 1. Hochstadt am Main; 2. Marktzeuln^{1,2}	2. Redwitz an der Rodach; 1. Marktgraitz^{2}; 2. Redwitz an der Rodach^{1}
^{1}seat of the Verwaltungsgemeinschaft; ^{2}Markt
