= Altenkunstadt =

- Municipality
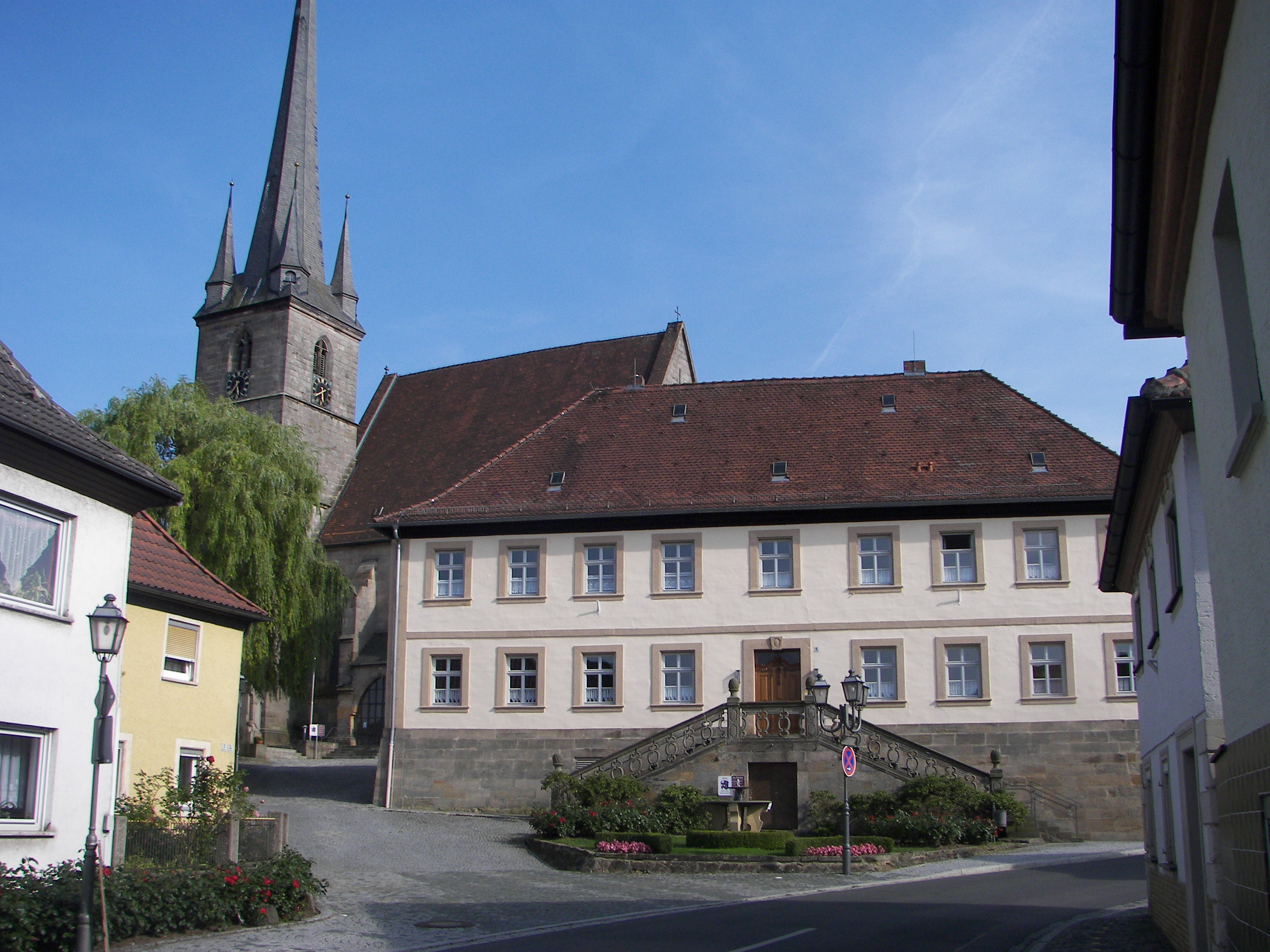
- Church of the Nativity of the Virgin Mary and the rectory

- Coat of arms

- Location of Altenkunstadt within Lichtenfels district
- Interactive map of Altenkunstadt
- Location within Germany Location within Bavaria
- Coordinates: 50°07′N 11°15′E
- Country: Germany
- State: Bavaria
- Admin. region: Oberfranken
- District: Lichtenfels
- Subdivisions: 12 Ortsteile

Government
  - Mayor (2020–26): Robert Hümmer (CSU)

Area
  - Total: 32.91 km^{2} (12.71 sq mi)
- Elevation: 292 m (958 ft)

Population (2025-12-31)
  - Total: 5,438
  - Density: 165.2/km^{2} (428.0/sq mi)
- Time zone: UTC+01:00 (CET)
  - Summer (DST): UTC+02:00 (CEST)
- Postal codes: 96264
- Dialling codes: 09572
- Vehicle registration: LIF/STE
- Website: www.altenkunstadt.de

Altenkunstadt (German pronunciation: [altn̩ˈkʊnʃtat]) is a municipality in the district of Lichtenfels in Bavaria, Germany. It lies on the left or south bank of the river Main across the valley from Burgkunstadt which sits on the hillside to the north.

== Sons and daughters ==
- Wolfgang Mack (1808–1883), German surgeon
- Alfred Nikolaus Witt (1914–1999), orthopedist and surgeon, university professor in Berlin and Munich
- Josef Seiz (1934–2010), German table tennis player
