= Weismain =

- Town
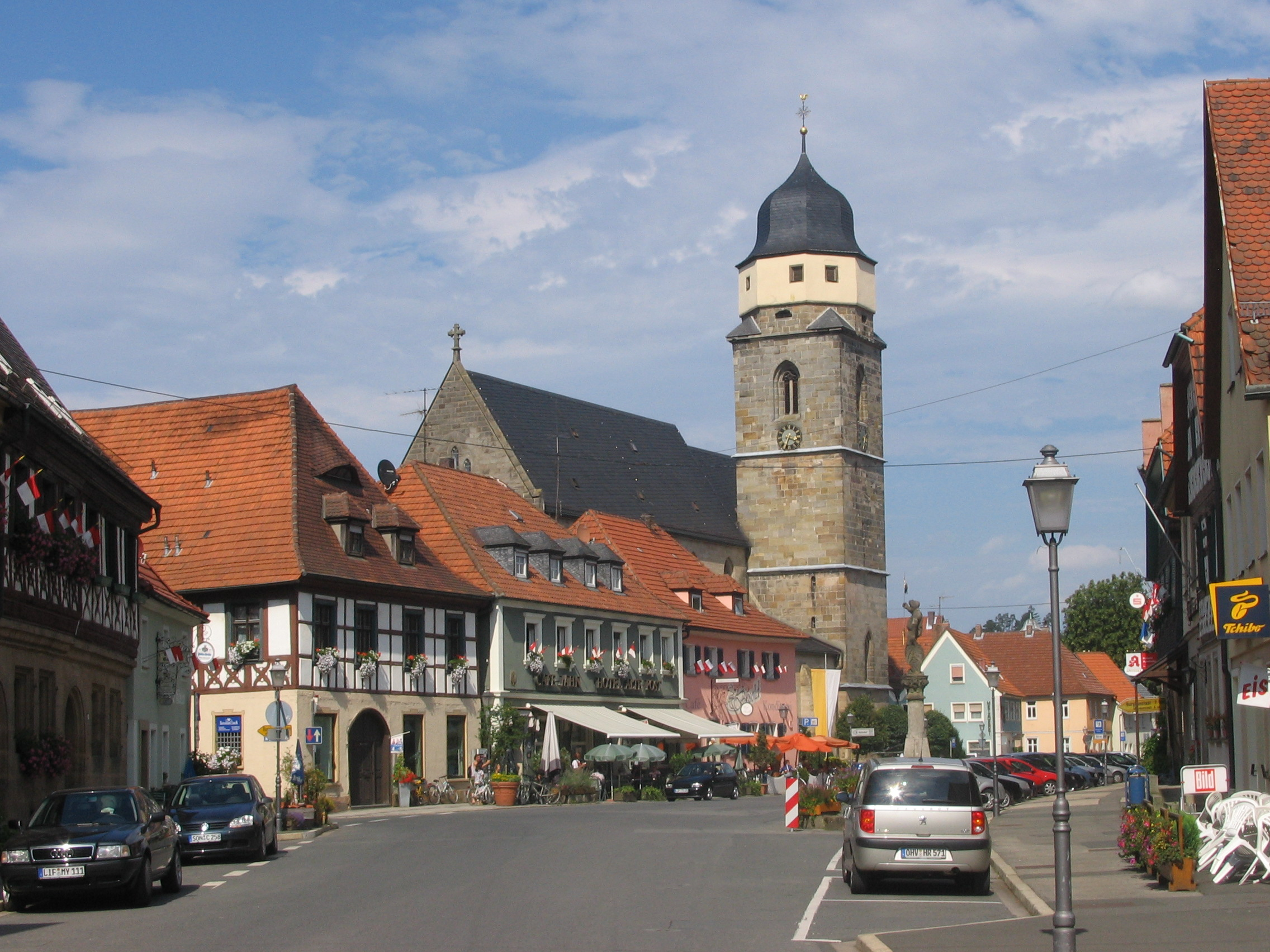
- The Old Town with the Church of Saint Martin

- Coat of arms

- Location of Weismain within Lichtenfels district
- Interactive map of Weismain
- Location within Germany Location within Bavaria
- Coordinates: 50°4′N 11°13′E
- Country: Germany
- State: Bavaria
- Admin. region: Oberfranken
- District: Lichtenfels
- Subdivisions: 34 Ortsteile

Government
  - Mayor (2020–26): Michael Zapf

Area
  - Total: 90.14 km^{2} (34.80 sq mi)
- Elevation: 316 m (1,037 ft)

Population (2025-12-31)
  - Total: 4,815
  - Density: 53.42/km^{2} (138.3/sq mi)
- Time zone: UTC+01:00 (CET)
  - Summer (DST): UTC+02:00 (CEST)
- Postal codes: 96260
- Dialling codes: 09575, 09576, 09220, 09504
- Vehicle registration: LIF/STE
- Website: www.weismain.de

Weismain (German pronunciation: [ˈvaɪsmaɪn]) is a town in the district of Lichtenfels, in northern Bavaria, Germany. It is situated 15 km west of Kulmbach, and 15 km southeast of Lichtenfels.
