= Upper Franconia =

Coordinates: 49°57′N 11°35′E

Upper Franconia Oberfranken (German)
- Regierungsbezirk
- Flag Coat of arms

- Map of Bavaria highlighting Upper Franconia
- Country: Germany
- State: Bavaria
- Region seat: Bayreuth

Government
  - District President: Henry Schramm (CSU)

Area
  - Total: 7,230.19 km^{2} (2,791.59 sq mi)

Population (31 December 2025)
  - Total: 1,051,584
  - Density: 145.443/km^{2} (376.697/sq mi)

GDP
  - Total: €51.407 billion (2024)
  - Per capita: €48,727 (2024)
- Website: regierung.oberfranken.bayern.de

Upper Franconia (German: Oberfranken, pronounced [ˈoːbɐˌfʁaŋkn̩]) is an administrative region (Regierungsbezirk) of the state of Bavaria, southern Germany. It forms part of the historically significant region of Franconia, the others being Middle Franconia and Lower Franconia, which are all part of Bavaria.

With more than 200 independent breweries which brew approximately 1000 different types of beer, Upper Franconia has the world's highest brewery-density per capita. A special Franconian beer route (Fränkische Brauereistraße) runs through many popular breweries.

== Geography ==
The administrative region borders on Thuringia (Thüringen) to the north, Lower Franconia (Unterfranken) to the west, Middle Franconia (Mittelfranken) to the south-west, and Upper Palatinate (Oberpfalz) to the south-east, Saxony (Sachsen) to the north-east and the Czech Republic to the east.

== History ==
After the founding of the Kingdom of Bavaria the state was totally reorganized and, in 1808, divided into 15 administrative government regions (German: Regierungsbezirke (singular Regierungsbezirk)), in Bavaria called Kreise (singular: Kreis). They were created in the fashion of the French departements, quite even in size and population, and named after their main rivers.

In the following years, due to territorial changes (e. g. loss of Tyrol, addition of the Palatinate), the number of Kreise was reduced to 8. One of these was the Mainkreis (Main District). In 1837 King Ludwig I of Bavaria renamed the Kreise after historical territorial names and tribes of the area. This also involved some border changes or territorial swaps. Thus the name Mainkreis changed to Upper Franconia.

== Main sights ==
Next to the former episcopal residence city of Bamberg, the capital Bayreuth, the former residence city of Coburg and the classicist centre of Hof, as well as the towns of Lichtenfels, Kronach, Gößweinstein and Kulmbach, the Weißenstein Palace, Banz Abbey and the Basilica of the Fourteen Holy Helpers, the scenic attractions of the River Main and the low mountain ranges of the Fichtel Mountains with the town of Wunsiedel and the Franconian Forest belong among the region's major tourist attractions. There are also numerous spas like Bad Rodach, Bad Steben, Bad Staffelstein, Bad Berneck and Bad Alexandersbad.

== Coat of arms ==
The coat of arms displays:
- the heraldic lion of Bamberg in the upper left
- the black and white pattern of the Hohenzollern family in the upper center
- the green crown in bend of the Arms of Saxony in the upper right
- the Arms of Franconia in the lower half

== Administrative subdivisions ==
Oberfranken is subdivided into nine Landkreise (districts) and four Kreisfreie Städte (district-free or independent cities). The lowest level is divided into 214 municipalities (including four cities).

Landkreise:

- Bamberg
- Bayreuth
- Coburg
- Forchheim
- Hof
- Kronach
- Kulmbach
- Lichtenfels
- Wunsiedel

Kreisfreie Städte:

- Bamberg
- Bayreuth
- Coburg
- Hof

== Historical population ==
Year	Population
1900	608,116
1910	661,862
1939	790,151
1950	1,088,721
1961	1,056,087
1970	1,079,131
1987	1,036,576
2002	1,112,655
2005	1,101,390
2006	1,094,525
2008	1,085,770
2010	1,071,984
2015	1,059,358
2019	1,065,371

== Economy ==
The gross domestic product (GDP) of the region was 40.6 billion € in 2018, accounting for 1.2% of German economic output. GDP per capita adjusted for purchasing power was €34,900 or 116% of the EU27 average in the same year. The GDP per employee was 96% of the EU average.

== See also ==
- Middle Franconia (Mittelfranken)
- Lower Franconia (Unterfranken)
- Kleinziegenfelder Tal
- Krassach (River)
