= Dober (Kremnitz) =

River in Germany

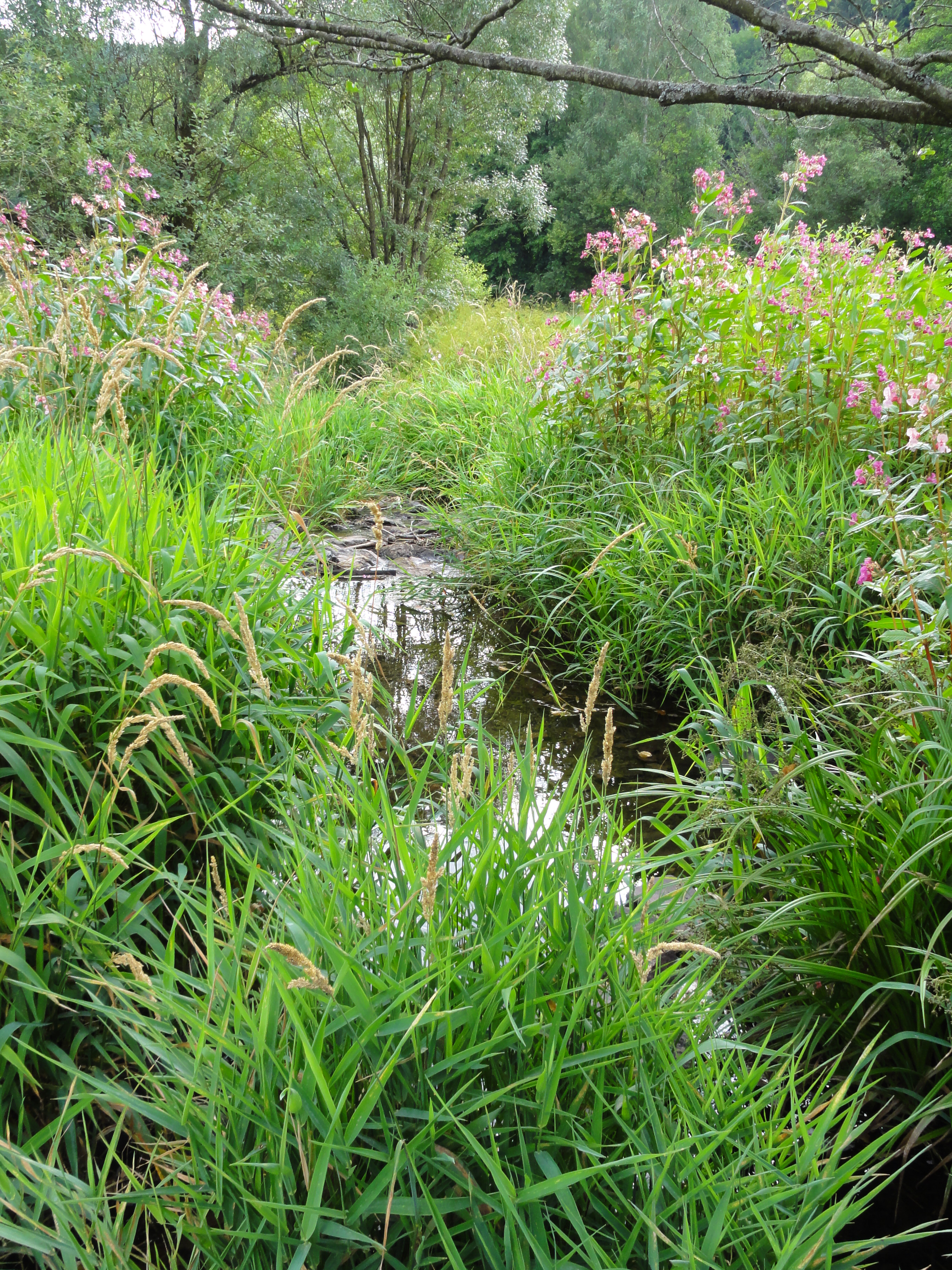
- Lower section of the Dober during the dry midsummer months

Location
- Country: Germany
- States: Thuringia and Bavaria

Physical characteristics
- Source
  - location: in the Franconian Forest, south of the Wetzstein and southwest of Brennersgrün, a district of Lehesten)
  - elevation: about 688 metres (2,257 ft)
- Mouth
  - location: Northwest of Lahm, a district of Wilhelmsthal into the Kremnitz
  - coordinates: 50.3521°N 11.3848°E
  - elevation: 422 metres (1,385 ft)
- Length: 11.8 km (7.3 mi)

Basin features
- Progression: Kremnitz→ Kronach→ Haßlach→ Rodach→ Main→ Rhine→ North Sea
- Tributaries
  - left: Dorfbach
  - right: Schwarze Sutte

Dober, also called Doberbach, is a river of Thuringia and Bavaria, Germany.

The Dober is about 12 kilometres (7.5 mi) long and is a left tributary of the Kremnitz. Its source is in the Franconian Forest, south of the Wetzstein and southwest of Brennersgrün, a district of Lehesten. Northwest of Lahm, a district of Wilhelmsthal, the Dober flows into the Kremnitz.

Tributaries of the Dober are the Schwarze Sutte from the right and the Dorfbach (in Tschirn) from the left.

== See also ==
- List of rivers of Thuringia
- List of rivers of Bavaria
