= Teuschnitz (Kremnitz) =

River in Germany

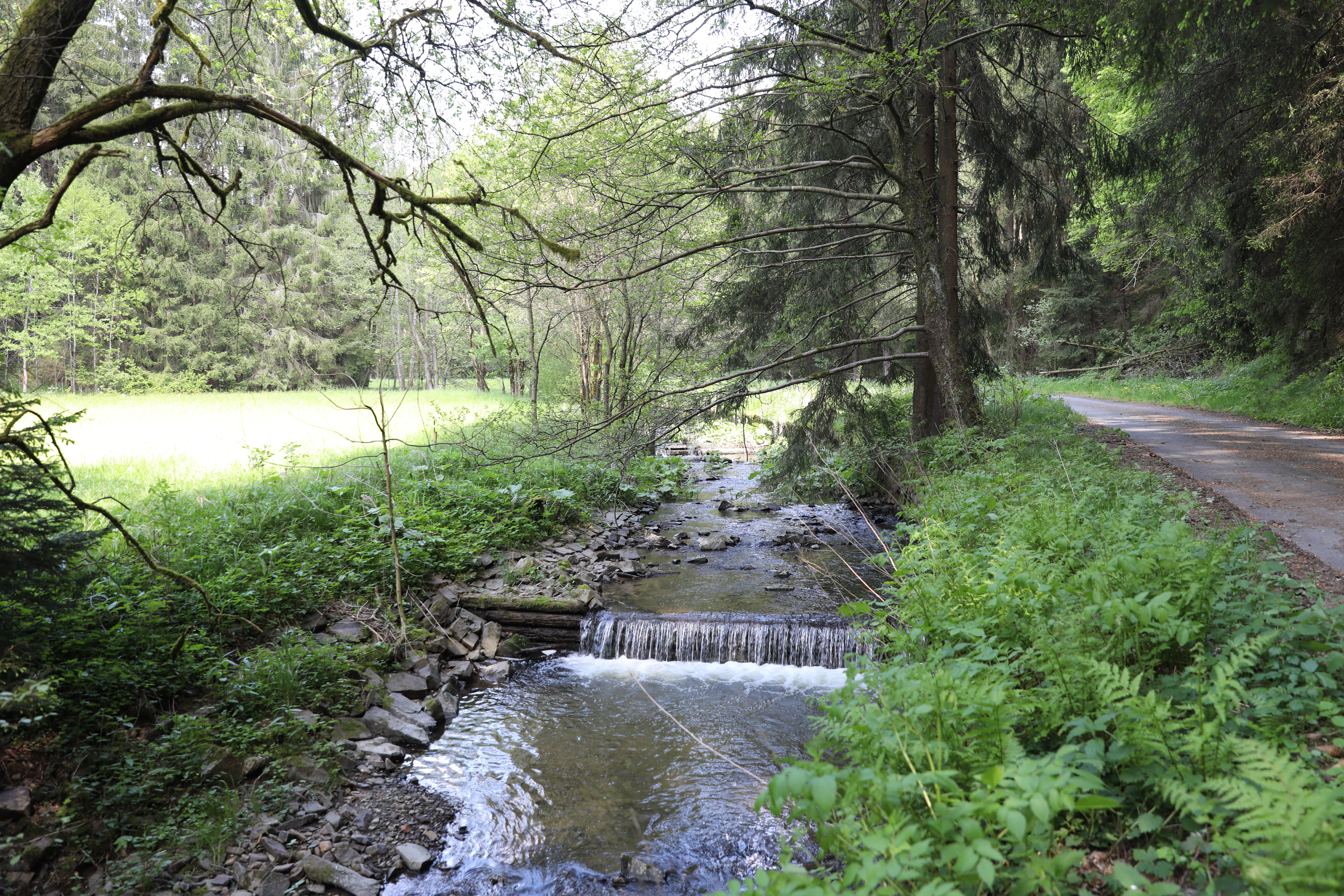
- The Teuschnitz at Posseck (Pressig)

Location
- Country: Germany
- State: Bavaria

Physical characteristics
- Mouth
  - location: Kremnitz
  - coordinates: 50.3202°N 11.3565°E

Basin features
- Progression: Kremnitz→ Kronach→ Haßlach→ Rodach→ Main→ Rhine→ North Sea

Teuschnitz is a river of Bavaria, Germany. It is a right tributary of the Kremnitz near Wilhelmsthal.

== See also ==
- List of rivers of Bavaria
