= Krebsbach (Steinach) =

River in Germany

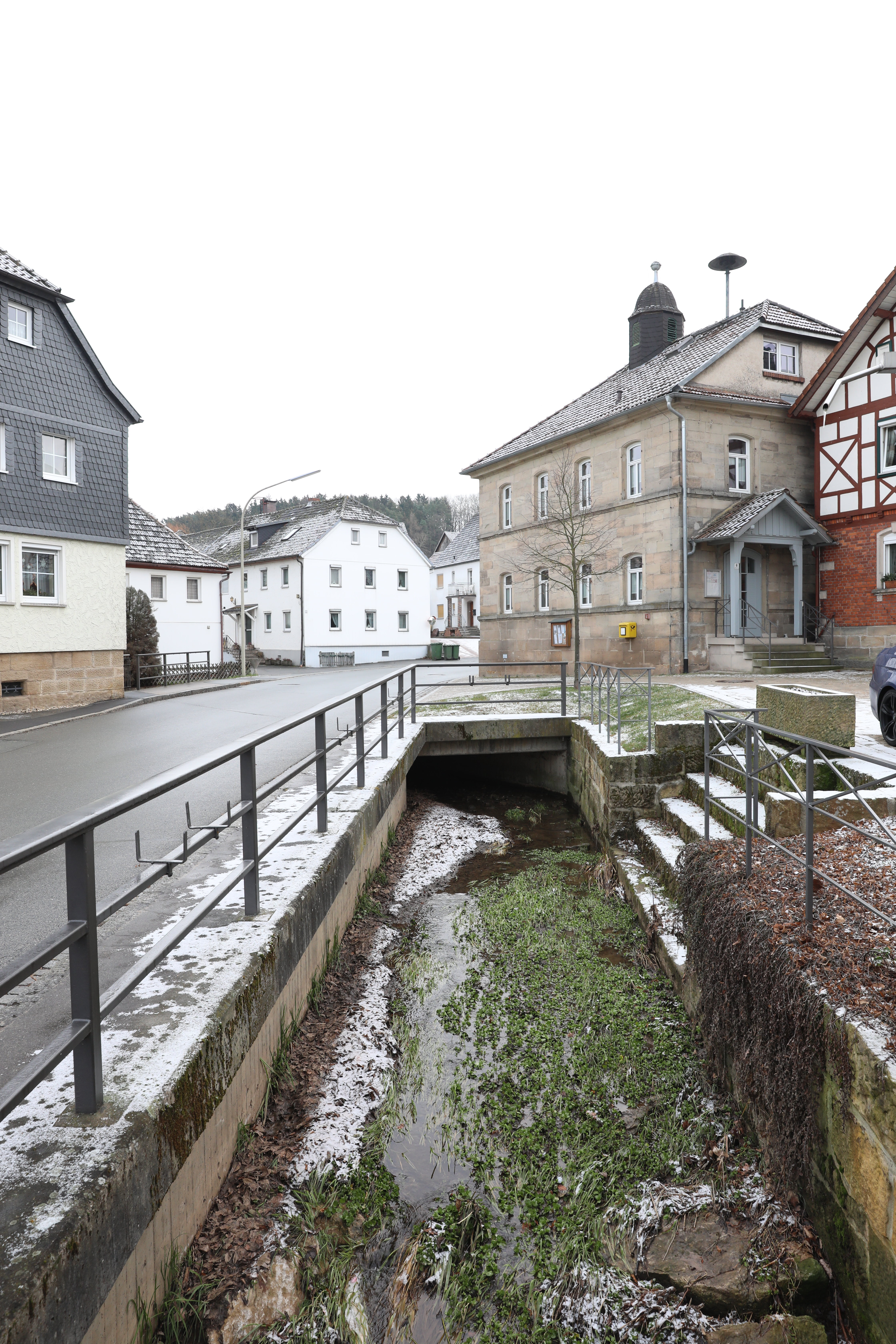
- The Krebsbach in Beikheim

Location
- Country: Germany
- States: Bavaria

Physical characteristics
- Mouth
  - location: Steinach
  - coordinates: 50.2122°N 11.2211°E

Basin features
- Progression: Steinach→ Rodach→ Main→ Rhine→ North Sea

Krebsbach is a small river in Bavaria, Germany. It flows into the Steinach near Schneckenlohe.

== Geography ==
=== Course ===
The Krebsbach is a stream in the north of Bavaria, which flows through Schölz, a parish of Küps at the hill Heidelberg of the Haßlacherbergkette. It flows into the Steinach in Beikheim, a part of Schneckenlohe.

=== Inflows ===
Vierlitzenbach, from the left, in Beikheim, 286 m above sea level

== See also ==
- List of rivers of Bavaria
