= Grümpel =

River in Germany

- The Grümpel at Lahm (part of Wilhelmsthal)

Location
- Country: Germany
- States: Bavaria

Physical characteristics
- Mouth
  - location: Kronach
  - coordinates: 50.2977°N 11.3666°E

Basin features
- Progression: Kronach→ Haßlach→ Rodach→ Main→ Rhine→ North Sea

Grümpel is a river of Bavaria, Germany. At its confluence with the Kremnitz near Wilhelmsthal, the Kronach is formed.

== See also ==
- List of rivers of Bavaria
