= Ludwigsstadt station =

Railway station in Germany

Ludwigsstadt

General information
- Location: Bahnhofstraße 14; 96337 Ludwigsstadt; Bavaria; Germany
- Coordinates: 50°29′13″N 11°22′57″E
- System: Bf
- Owner: Deutsche Bahn
- Operator: DB Station&Service
- Lines: Franconian Forest Railway; Ludwigsstadt–Lehesten railway
- Platforms: 1 island platform 1 side platform
- Tracks: 3
- Train operators: DB Regio Bayern

Other information
- Station code: 3844
- DS100 code: NLUS
- IBNR: 8003770
- Category: 6
- Website: www.bahnhof.de

Services
Preceding station	DB Fernverkehr	Following station
Kronach towards Karlsruhe Hbf	IC 61	Saalfeld (Saale) towards Leipzig Hbf
Preceding station	DB Regio Bayern	Following station
Steinbach am Wald towards Nürnberg Hbf	RE 14	Probstzella towards Saalfeld (Saale)
Location
- Location within Bavaria Location within Germany Location within Europe

Ludwigsstadt station is a railway station in the town of Ludwigsstadt, located in the Kronach district in Upper Franconia, Bavaria, Germany.
