= Steinbach am Wald station =

Railway station in Germany

Steinbach am Wald Steinbach a Wald
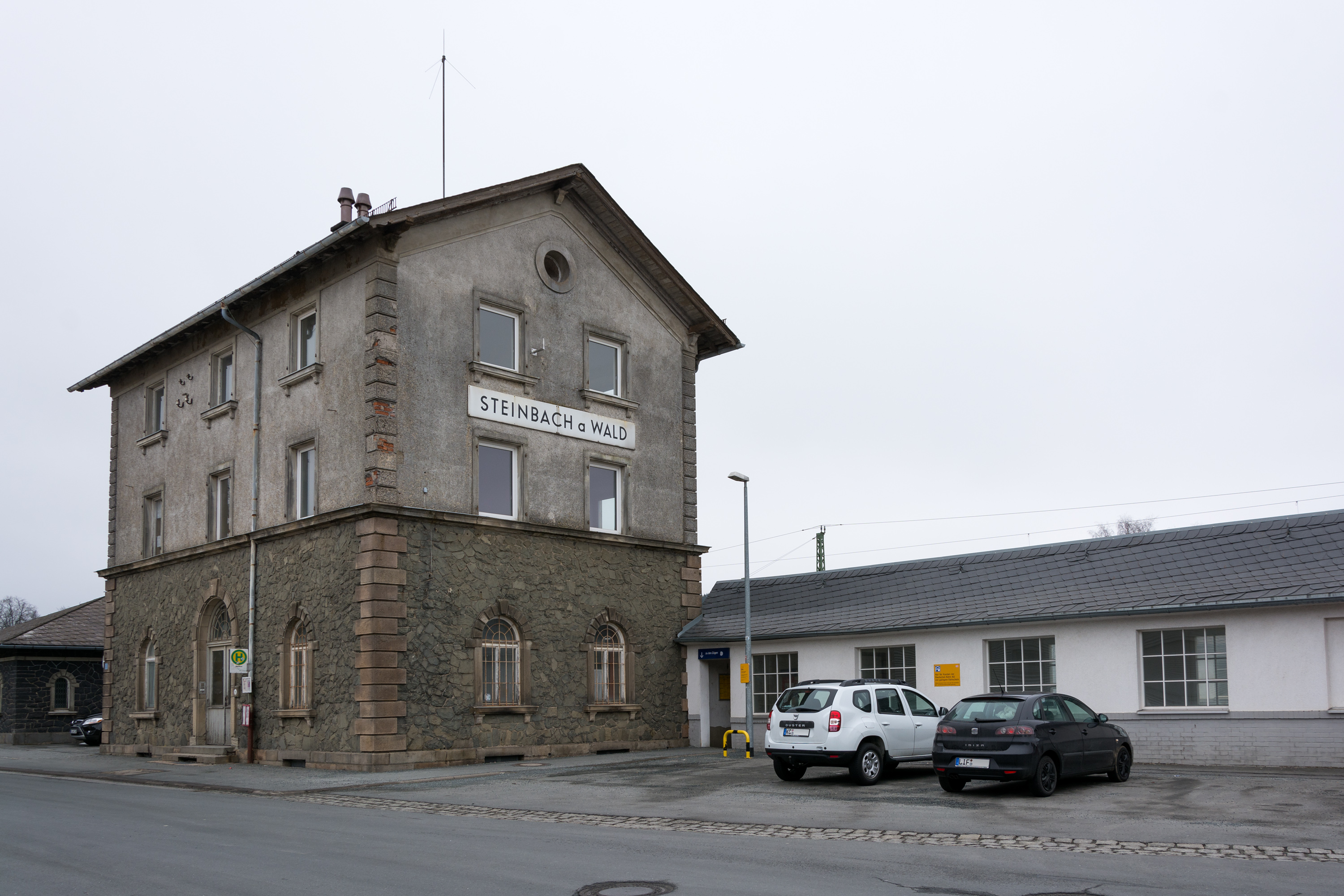

General information
- Location: Otto-Wiegand-Straße 7; 96361 Steinbach am Wald; Bavaria; Germany
- Coordinates: 50°26′30″N 11°22′57″E
- System: Bf
- Owner: Deutsche Bahn
- Operator: DB Station&Service
- Line: Franconian Forest Railway
- Platforms: 1 island platform 1 side platform
- Tracks: 3
- Train operators: DB Regio Bayern

Other information
- Station code: 5989
- DS100 code: NSD
- IBNR: 8005692
- Category: 5
- Website: www.bahnhof.de

Services
Preceding station	DB Regio Bayern	Following station
Pressig-Rothenkirchen towards Nürnberg Hbf	RE 14	Ludwigsstadt towards Saalfeld (Saale)
Location
- Location within Bavaria

Steinbach am Wald station is a railway station in the municipality of Steinbach am Wald, located in the Kronach district in Upper Franconia, Bavaria, Germany.
