= Teuschnitz (Verwaltungsgemeinschaft) =

- Verwaltungsgemeinschaft
- Location of Teuschnitz within Kronach district
- Interactive map of Teuschnitz
- Location within Germany Location within Bavaria
- Coordinates: 50°23′N 11°23′E
- Country: Germany
- State: Bavaria
- Admin. region: Upper Franconia
- District: Kronach
- Seat: Teuschnitz
- Subdivisions: 3 municipalities

Area
  - Total: 63.05 km^{2} (24.34 sq mi)

Population (2025-12-31)
  - Total: 2,975
  - Density: 47.18/km^{2} (122.2/sq mi)
- Time zone: UTC+01:00 (CET)
  - Summer (DST): UTC+02:00 (CEST)
- Website: www.verwaltungsgemeinschaft-teuschnitz.de

Teuschnitz is a Verwaltungsgemeinschaft (municipal association) in the district of Kronach in Bavaria, Germany. Its seat is in Teuschnitz.

It consists of the following municipalities:

1. Reichenbach
2. Teuschnitz
3. Tschirn
