= Rodach =

Rodach may refer to several locations in southern Germany:

- Rodach (Itz), a tributary of the Itz river
- Rodach (Main), a tributary of the Main river
- Wilde Rodach, also a tributary of the Main river
- Bad Rodach, a city in the district of Coburg, Bavaria
- Marktrodach, a city in the district of Kronach, Bavaria
