= Wetzstein =

Wetzstein may refer to:

== Mountains in Germany ==
- Wetzstein (Hesse), in north-central Hesse
- Wetzstein (Thuringia), in southern Thuringia

== People with the surname ==
- Johann Gottfried Wetzstein (1815–1905), Orientalist and Prussian diplomat
