= Göritz (disambiguation) =

Göritz is a municipality in Brandenburg, Germany.

Göritz or Goritz may also refer to:

== Places ==
- Göritz (river), Thuringia, Germany
- Göritz, Thuringia, a district of the town Hirschberg, Thuringia, Germany
- Górzyca, Lubusz Voivodeship (German name Göritz), a village in western Poland
- Gorzyca, West Pomeranian Voivodeship (German name Göritz), a village in north-western Poland

== People ==
- Hansjörg Göritz (born 1959), German-American architect, professor, author and designer
- Johannes Goritz (1457–1527), art patron
- Otto Goritz (1873–1929), German baritone
