= Oberlangenstadt =

Coordinates: 50.188°N 11.257°E

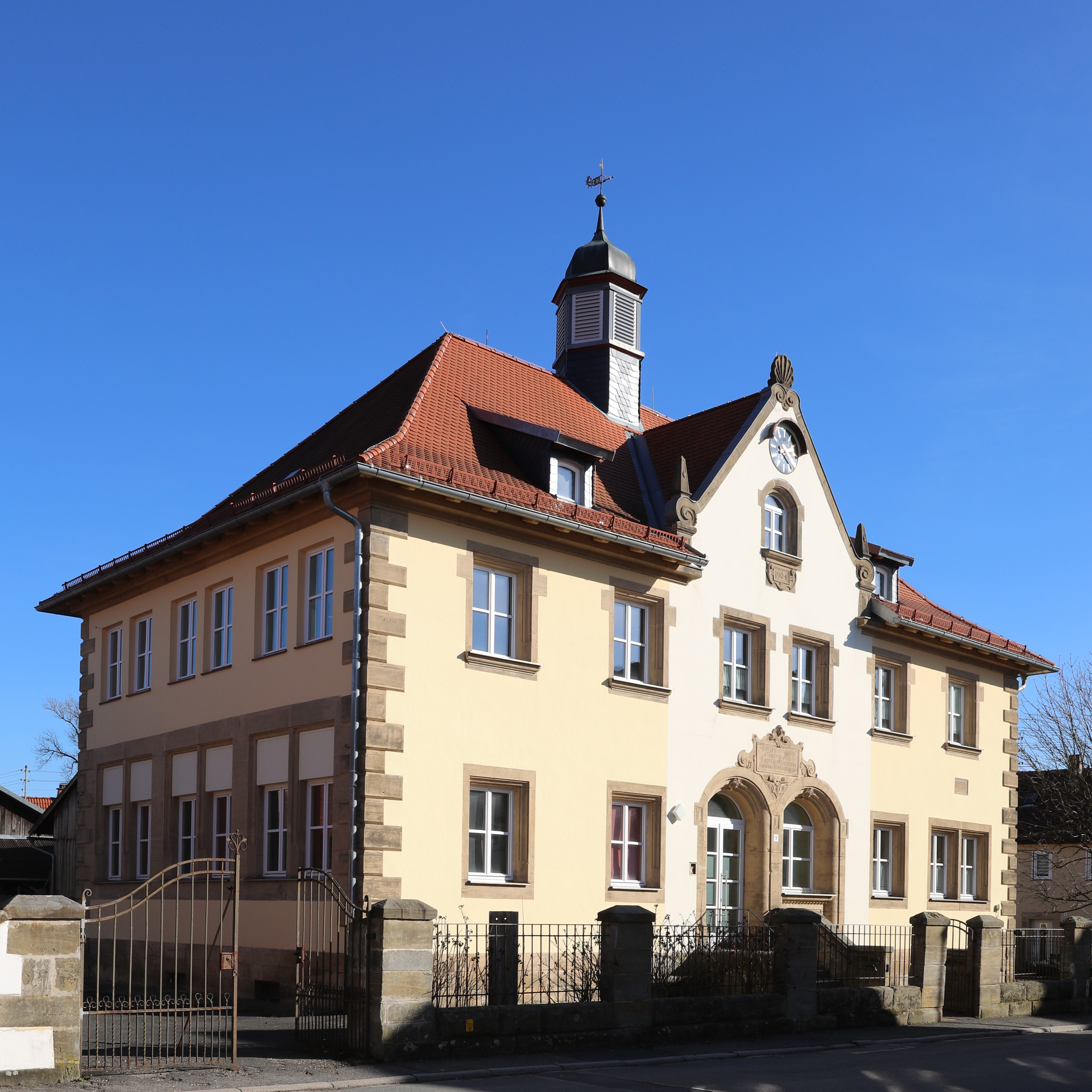

Oberlangenstadt is a village in the municipality of Küps in Kronach district, Upper Franconia, in the state of Bavaria, Germany.

== Transportation ==
Oberlangenstadt lies on the B 173 main road and the railway line from Munich to Berlin.

== Sport and leisure facilities ==
- Oberlangenstadt football ground
- Nagel golf club
