= Kremnitz =

Kremnitz may refer to:

- Kremnitz (Kronach), river in Bavaria, Germany
- Kremnica, a town in Slovakia which is known as Kremnitz in German
- Mite Kremnitz (1852–1916), German-Romanian writer
- Kremenets, a city in Ukraine
