= Göritz (river) =

Location
- Country: Germany
- States: Thuringia

Physical characteristics
- Mouth
  - location: Steinach
  - coordinates: 50.4498°N 11.1466°E

Basin features
- Progression: Steinach→ Rodach→ Main→ Rhine→ North Sea

Göritz is a river of Thuringia, Germany. It is a right tributary of the Steinach, which it joins near the town Steinach.

== See also ==
- List of rivers of Thuringia
