= Mitwitz =

- Municipality
- Coat of arms

- Location of Mitwitz within Kronach district
- Interactive map of Mitwitz
- Location within Germany Location within Bavaria
- Coordinates: 50°14′53″N 11°12′35″E
- Country: Germany
- State: Bavaria
- Admin. region: Oberfranken
- District: Kronach
- Municipal assoc.: Mitwitz

Government
  - Mayor (2020–26): Oliver Plewa (CSU)

Area
  - Total: 33.19 km^{2} (12.81 sq mi)
- Elevation: 304 m (997 ft)

Population (2025-12-31)
  - Total: 2,721
  - Density: 81.98/km^{2} (212.3/sq mi)
- Time zone: UTC+01:00 (CET)
  - Summer (DST): UTC+02:00 (CEST)
- Postal codes: 96268
- Dialling codes: 09266
- Vehicle registration: KC
- Website: www.mitwitz.de

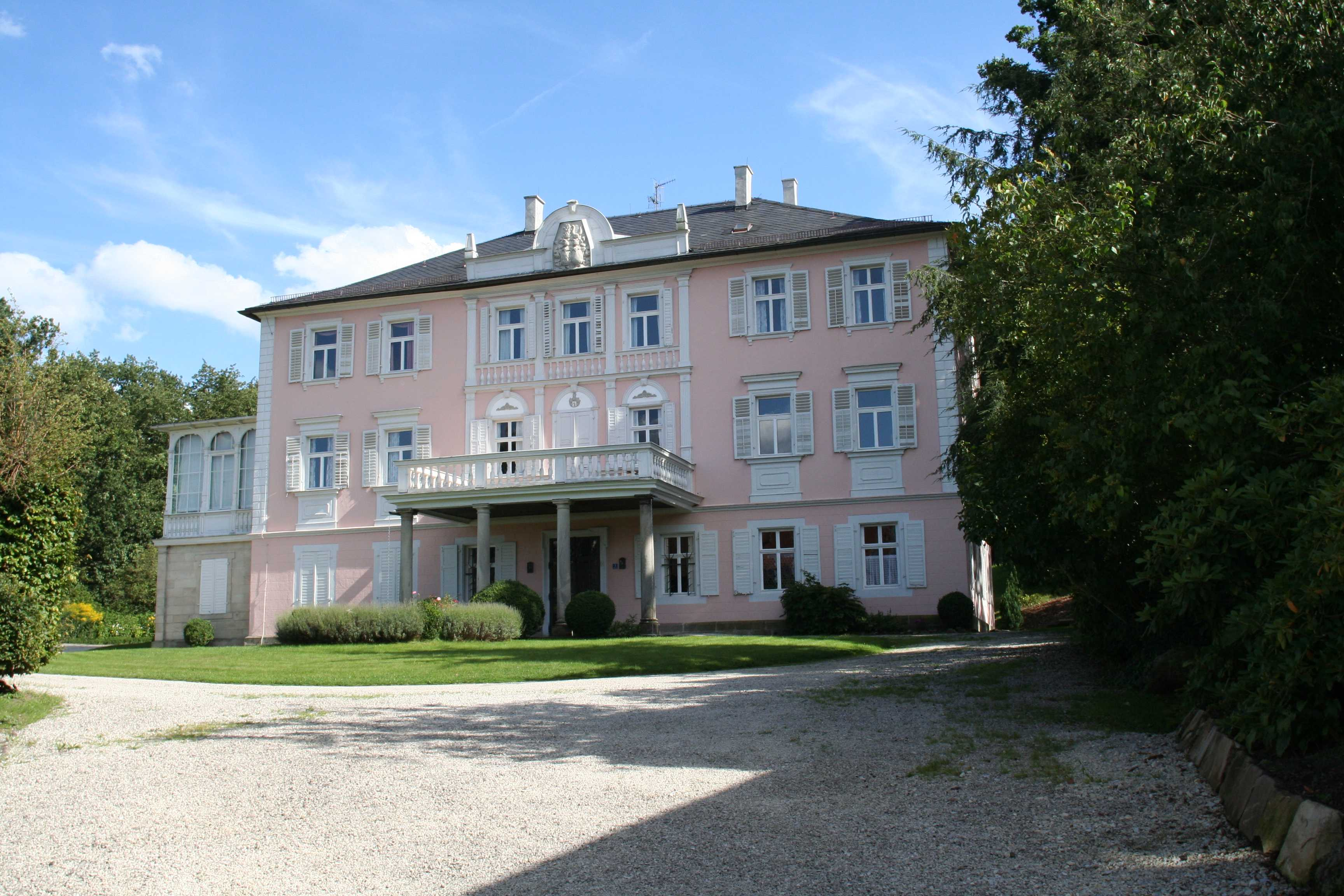
Oberes Schloss (1713)

Mitwitz is a municipality in the district of Kronach in Bavaria in Germany. It lies on the Steinach river and the Föritz (which flows into the Steinach), on the edge of the Franconian Forest on the route between Kronach and Coburg.
