= Frederick Hoelzel =

German-American physiologist and fasting researcher

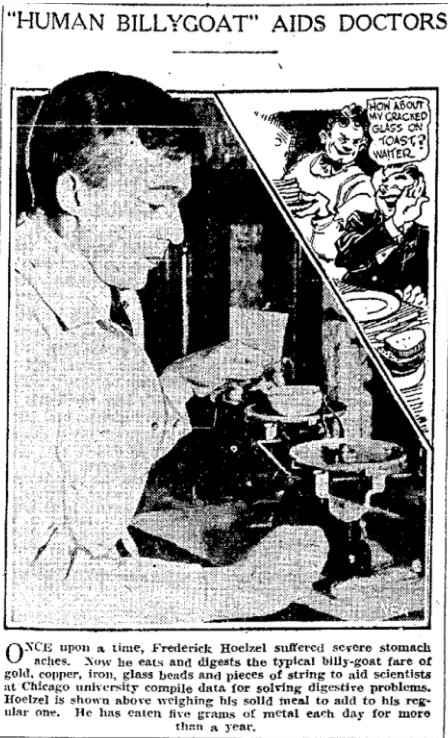
- Born: 5 May 1888; Küps, Bavaria
- Died: 1963 (aged 74–75)
- Occupations: Physiologist, writer

Frederick Hoelzel (5 May 1889 – 1963) was a German American physiologist and fasting researcher, best known for consuming indigestible objects. The press nicknamed hoezel Billygoat".

== Biography ==
Hoelzel was born in Küps, Bavaria and moved to the United States as a child. He was a volunteer physiologist at University of Chicago during 1925-1933 and 1937-1942. He was assistant physiologist during 1942-1956. He aided physiologist Anton Julius Carlson in research work on digestion. He was associated with Carlson for 40 years. Hoelzel lived in small room in a laboratory at the University of Chicago. He received no pay, only bedding and meals.

Hoelzel on different occasions spent time fasting under scientific observation. He fasted for periods of 8-41 consecutive days. His fasting experiment was conducted at the University of Chicago. In 1912, he fasted for 8 days, in 1913 for 26 days and in 1917 for 15 days. The results revealed that his hunger disappeared after 5 days but weakness, fatigue and nausea remained.

Hoelzel swallowed coal powder, gravel, glass beads, rubber, steel balls, surgical cotton, twine, wire and other inert items to show how long they would take to would pass through his intestines. The objects were mixed with his meals. He volunteered for the unusual experiment because he had already suffered from digestive troubles and hoped the research would aid in curing indigestion. The results were published in the American Journal of Physiology, 1930.

Hoelzel was known to have eaten surgical cotton doused with fruit juice for a few days. In 1919, he invented cellulose-based flour. Hoelzel's experiences in nutrition from 1908-1953 are documented in his book A Devotion to Nutrition, published in 1954.

== Selected publications ==
- Hoelzel, F. (1930). "The Rate of Passage of Inert Materials through the Digestive Tract". American Journal of Physiology. 92 (2): 466–497. doi:10.1152/ajplegacy.1930.92.2.466.
- Hoelzel, F. (1948). "Nutrition and Efficiency". The American Journal of Digestive Diseases. 15 (12): 416–421. doi:10.1007/BF03001593. PMID 18098760.
- Hoelzel, F; Carlson, A. J. (1949). "Relation of Diet to Diverticulosis of the Colon in Rats". Gastroenterology. 12: 108–115. doi:10.1016/S0016-5085(49)80011-4.
- Hoelzel, F.; Carlson, A. J. (1952). "The Alleged Disappearance of Hunger During Starvation". Science. 115 (2993): 526–527. doi:10.1126/science.115.2993.526.b. S2CID 239828919.
- Hoelzel, F. (1954). A Devotion to Nutrition. New York: Vantage Press.
- Hoelzel, F. (1960). "Starvation With and Without Painful Hunger Pangs". Science. 132 (3430): 841–845. Bibcode:1960Sci...132..841H. doi:10.1126/science.132.3430.841. PMID 17813760.

== See also ==
- Michel Lotito (famous for deliberately consuming indigestible objects)
- Alexis St. Martin
