= Dober =

Dober may refer to:

- Dobër, a settlement in northern Albania, today part of the municipality Malësi e Madhe
- Dober (Kremnitz), a river of Thuringia and Bavaria, Germany, tributary of the Kremnitz
- Andreas Dober (born 1986), Austrian football player
- Drew Dober (born 1988), American mixed martial artist
- Johann Leonhard Dober (1706–1766), one of the two first missionaries of the Moravian Brethren (Herrnhuter Brüdergemeine) in the West Indies
- Richard Dessureault-Dober (born 1981), Canadian sprint kayaker
- Con Conrad (né Conrad K. Dober, 1891–1938), American songwriter and producer
