= Ludwigsstadt–Lehesten railway =

1885–1971 branch line in north Bavaria, Germany

Ludwigsstadt–Lehesten
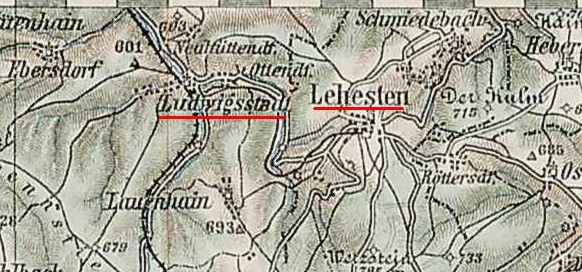

Overview
- Line number: 5015

Service
- Route number: 414z

Technical
- Line length: 7.6 km (4.7 mi)
- Track gauge: 1,435 mm (4 ft 8 1/2 in)
- Minimum radius: 150 m (492 ft)
- Maximum incline: 3.13 %

The Ludwigsstadt–Lehesten railway was a branch line in southern Germany that branched off from the Franconian Forest Railway at Ludwigsstadt in the Bavarian province of Upper Franconia and ran to Lehesten in the state of Thuringia. It was closed in 1971.

In 1885, two months after the completion of the Franconian Forest Railway, a 7.6 kilometre long Sekundärbahn branch was opened that ran from the Upper Franconian town of Ludwigsstadt to the south Thuringian village of Lehesten. The slate quarries at Lehesten, which in 1880 manufactured 646,226 zentners of roofing and housing slates as well as slate tables, were particularly interested in a railway connexion. A state treaty between the Kingdom of Bavaria und the Duchy of Saxe-Meiningen was required, however, to establish the line; this was signed on 16 June 1884. The brunt of the cost (0.515 million marks) was borne by Saxe-Meiningen, the construction and operation of the branch line was carried out by the Royal Bavarian State Railways. Construction began in September 1884 and the line was opened on 1 December 1885.

The line branched off the Franconian Forest Railway south of the Trogenbach bridge heading eastwards and followed the rivers Loquitz and Aue. 5.3 kilometres were on Bavarian territory and 2.3 kilometres on Thuringian soil. The largest structures were in Ludwigsstadt: the Hasslach Viaduct and a road bridge. A bridge over the Loquitz at Lehesten was also needed.

Until 1945 there were usually four pairs of passenger trains per day with a journey time of about 25 minutes. Goods traffic on the line was also important, especially for the transportation of slate.

On 3 July 1945 Thuringia was occupied by Soviet troops and, because the new zonal border, that followed the old state border, crossed the railway line, train services were suspended. Not until 17 June 1947 was goods traffic reinstated between Probstzella and Lehesten, using a pair of scheduled trains and a pair of request trains for transit goods. On 12 July 1951 the transit services were suspended again and by 28 May 1952 the section in Thuringia was dismantled.

The remaining section of line in Bavaria was officially closed on 1 March 1971. Until the early 1960s there was still goods traffic to a stone quarry siding at kilometre marker 2.8.

== Sources ==
- Ulrich Rockelmann, Thomas Naumann: Die Frankenwaldbahn. Die Geschichte der Steilrampe über den Frankenwald. EK-Verlag Freiburg, 1997. ISBN 3-88255-581-5
