= Stockheim =

- Municipality
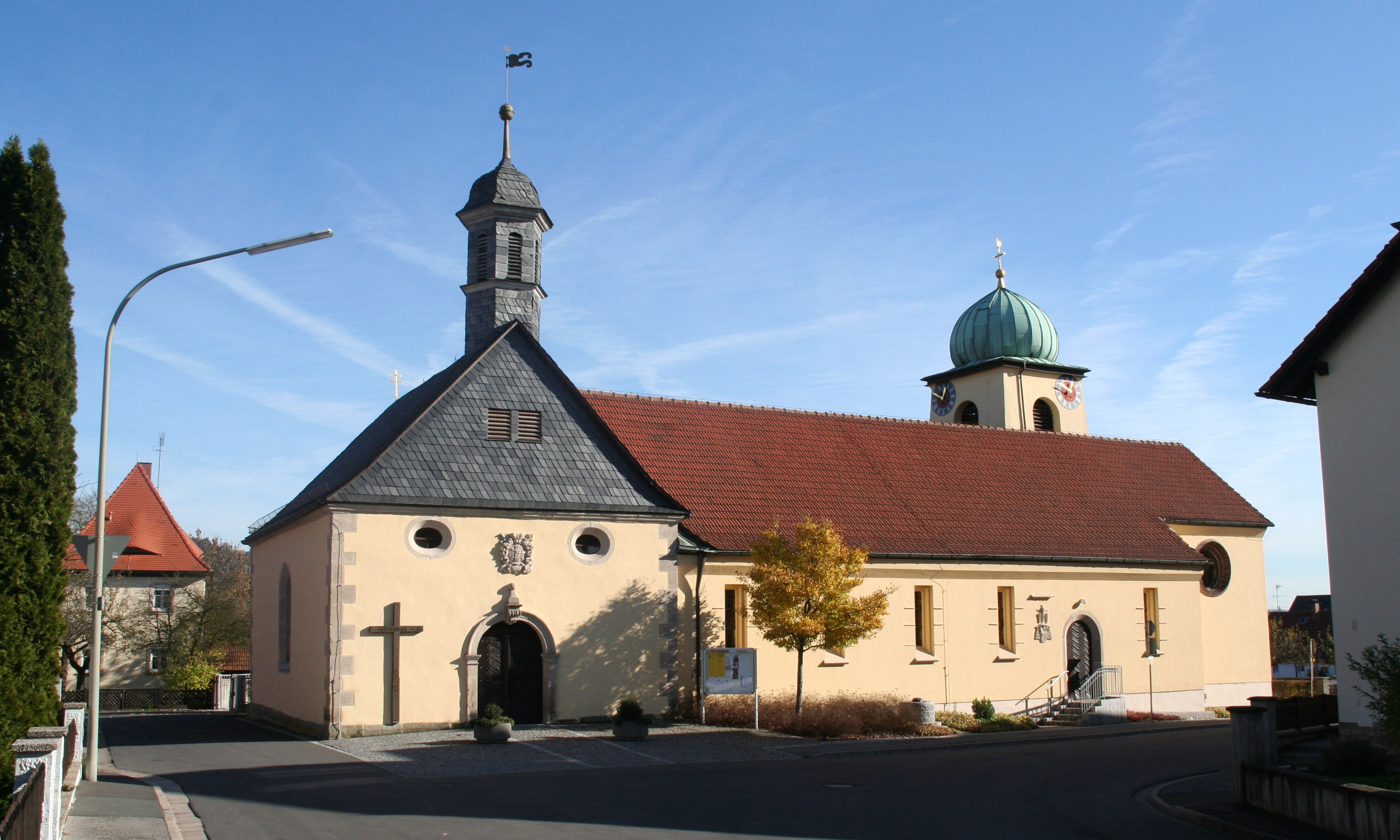
- Church of Saint Wolfgang

- Coat of arms

- Location of Stockheim within Kronach district
- Interactive map of Stockheim
- Location within Germany Location within Bavaria
- Coordinates: 50°18′17″N 11°17′01″E
- Country: Germany
- State: Bavaria
- Admin. region: Oberfranken
- District: Kronach
- Subdivisions: 7 Gemeindeteile

Government
  - Mayor (2023–29): Daniel Weißerth (CSU)

Area
  - Total: 25.37 km^{2} (9.80 sq mi)
- Elevation: 354 m (1,161 ft)

Population (2025-12-31)
  - Total: 4,617
  - Density: 182.0/km^{2} (471.3/sq mi)
- Time zone: UTC+01:00 (CET)
  - Summer (DST): UTC+02:00 (CEST)
- Postal codes: 96342
- Dialling codes: 09265
- Vehicle registration: KC
- Website: www.stockheim-online.de

Stockheim (German pronunciation: [ˈʃtɔkhaɪm]) is a municipality in the district of Kronach in Bavaria in Germany. It is located on Bundesstraße 85, and on the touristic route Bier- und Burgenstraße (Beer- and Castle Road).
