= Brütting =

German shoe manufacturer

Brütting & Co. EB-Sport Int. GmbH
- Industry: Shoes
- Founded: 1946
- Headquarters: Küps, Bavaria
- Key people: Tobias Dormann (Managing Director)
- Number of employees: < 100
- Website: www.brütting.com

Brütting is a German shoe manufacturer based in Küps, Bavaria. Founded by Eugen Brütting in 1946, it began with a factory in Nuremberg producing high-fashion women’s shoes under the Maestro Eugenio brand. Brütting held several patents, some utilized by Rudolf Dassler in 1952. GEKA Sport Limited operates as a division of Brütting.

== History ==
Eugen Brütting established the company in 1946, initially crafting high-fashion women’s shoes in Nuremberg under the Maestro Eugenio label. By 1952, Rudolf Dassler had adopted some of Brütting’s patented designs. After a dispute with Dassler in 1965, Brütting launched a sports division, forming EB-Sport-International to focus on track and field athletes. To counter the seasonal nature of fashion shoes, the company imported tracksuits and equipment from France (Trévoir) and developed specialized footwear for sports such as fencing, weightlifting, boxing, wrestling, and running.

In 1966, Arnd Krüger became the first German indoor champion in Brütting racing spikes. Starting in 1968, Brütting offered hand-crafted shoes to athletes, including free high-fashion shoes for women. Notable wearers included Liesel Westermann, silver medalist in discus throw at the 1968 Summer Olympics, and Bernd Kannenberg, gold medalist in 50 km race walking, as well as boxer Peter Mueller.In 1970. Brütting collaborated with coach Arthur Lydiard and athletes to develop the Roadrunner, a running shoe praised for its unique lasts. The Siesta, a recreational shoe based on the Roadrunner, adapted well to individual feet. In 1972, Olympic torch relay runner Günter Zahn was barred from wearing Brütting shoes due to Adidas’s sponsorship of the German Olympic Committee. Recognizing the growing tennis market, Brütting introduced a tennis trainer line.

In 1973, Gerhard Krapp founded GEKA-Sport Limited, a competitor. In 1984, Bernhard Meyer joined Krapp as Brütting’s second executive director, and together they acquired the company, renaming it EB-Sport Schuh-Vertrieb GmbH. Brütting served as a modeler and consultant until his death in 1991, when the company became Brütting & Co. EB-Sport Int. GmbH. Krapp retired in 2002, leaving Meyer as owner. In 2007, Tobias Dormann succeeded Meyer as executive director, with Meyer remaining as a consultant. That year, Brütting launched EB-Kids, replacing the “Maus” children’s shoe collection.

== Products ==
Roadrunner remains Brütting’s best-selling shoe, followed by Astroturfer, Marathon, and Multiplex, all hand-crafted in Germany. The company produces shoes for running, indoor sports, fashion, wellness, oversized feet, children, Nordic walking, trekking/outdoor, tennis, and soccer.
