= Kronach (Haßlach) =

River in Germany

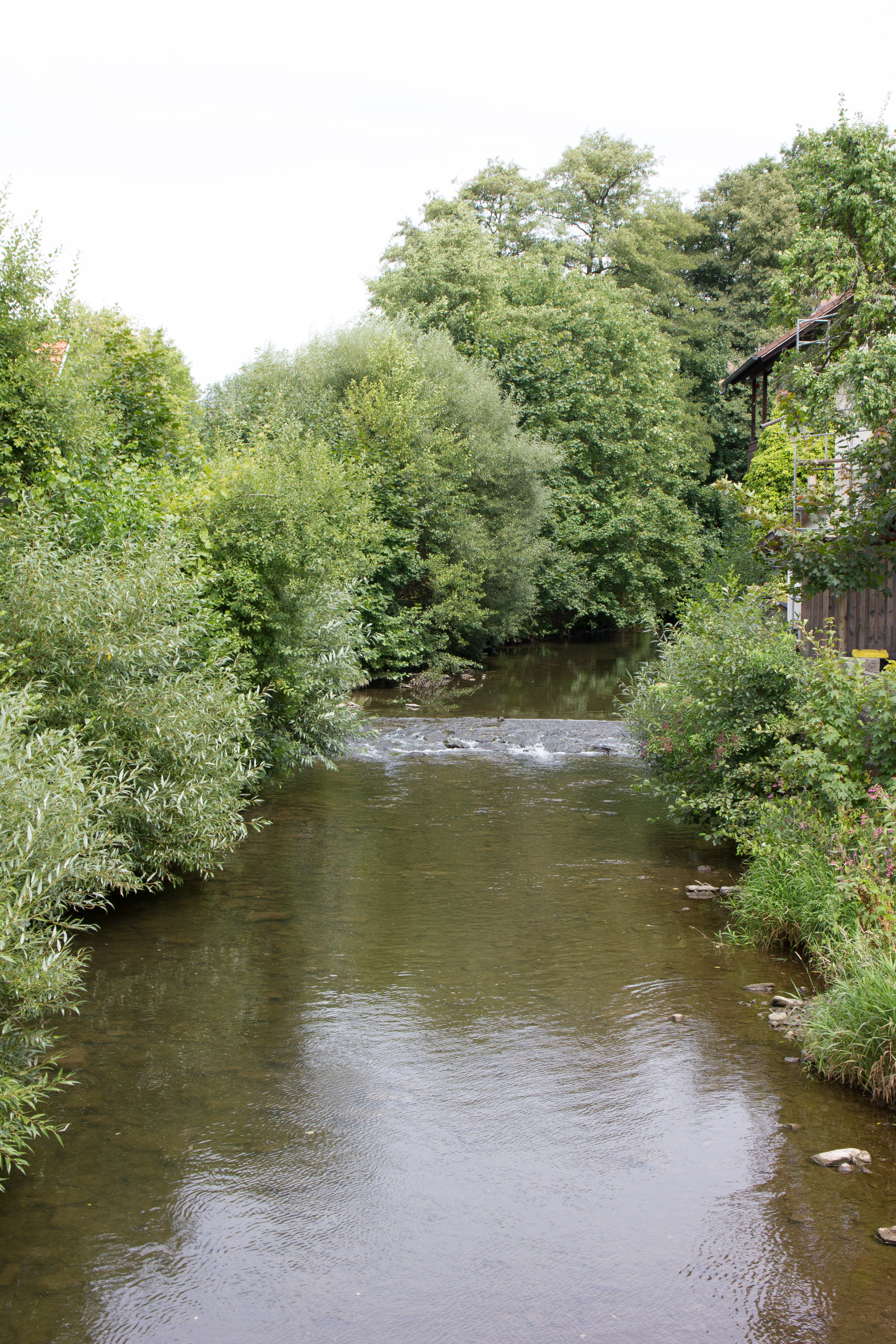
- View from Kaulanger bridge in Kronach

Location
- Country: Germany
- State: Bayern
- District: Upper Franconia
- Reference no.: DE: 241446

Physical characteristics
- Source
  - location: Source: Confluence of Kremnitz and Grümpel at Wilhelmsthal
  - coordinates: 50°17′52″N 11°22′00″E
  - elevation: 356 m above sea level (NN)
- Mouth
  - location: Confluence: in Kronach into Haßlach
  - coordinates: 50°14′13″N 11°19′14″E
  - elevation: ca. 305 m above sea level (NN)
- Length: 7.94 km (4.93 mi) (with Kremnitz 27.6 km (17.1 mi))
- Discharge
  - location: at Steinberg gauge
  - average: 1.7 m^{3}/s (60 cu ft/s)
  - minimum: Record low: 8 L/s (0.28 cu ft/s); Average low: 120 L/s (4.2 cu ft/s)
  - maximum: Average high: 26.4 m^{3}/s (930 cu ft/s); Record high: 58.4 m^{3}/s (2,060 cu ft/s) (in 1947)

Basin features
- Progression: Haßlach→ Rodach→ Main→ Rhine→ North Sea
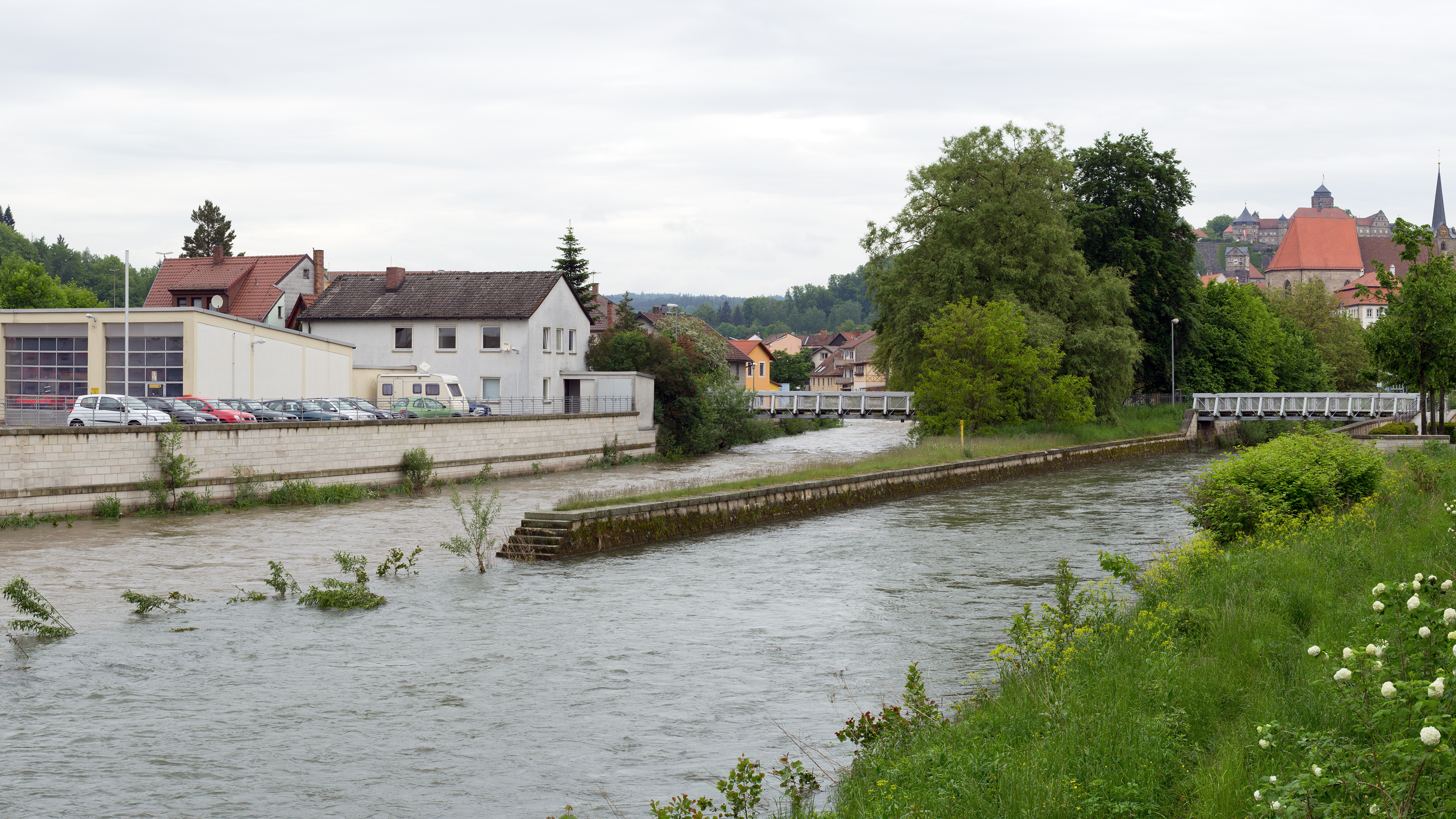
- Confluence of Kronach (right) into the Haßlach (left) during the 2013 European floods

The Kronach (German pronunciation: [ˈkʁoːnax]) is a river in Upper Franconia, Bavaria, Germany. It is about 8 km (5.0 mi) long and is formed from the confluence of the rivers Kremnitz and Grümpel, south of Wilhelmsthal. Including its source rivers Kremnitz and Finsterbach, the Kronach is 27.6 km (17.1 mi) long. From there it flows in a generally southerly direction to its confluence with the Haßlach at the town of Kronach. The ST2200 road, which connects those two places, follows its valley.

== See also ==
- List of rivers of Bavaria
