= Wilde Rodach =

River in Germany

Location
- Country: Germany
- State: Bavaria

Physical characteristics
- Mouth
  - location: Rodach
  - coordinates: 50.2787°N 11.4323°E
- Length: 21.9 km (13.6 mi)

Basin features
- Progression: Rodach→ Main→ Rhine→ North Sea

Wilde Rodach is a river in Bavaria, Germany. It flows into the Rodach northeast of Marktrodach.

== See also ==
- List of rivers of Bavaria
