= Hochstadt-Marktzeuln–Probstzella railway =

Railway line in Germany

Coordinates: 50.1532°N 11.1716°E

Hochstadt-Marktzeuln–Probstzella
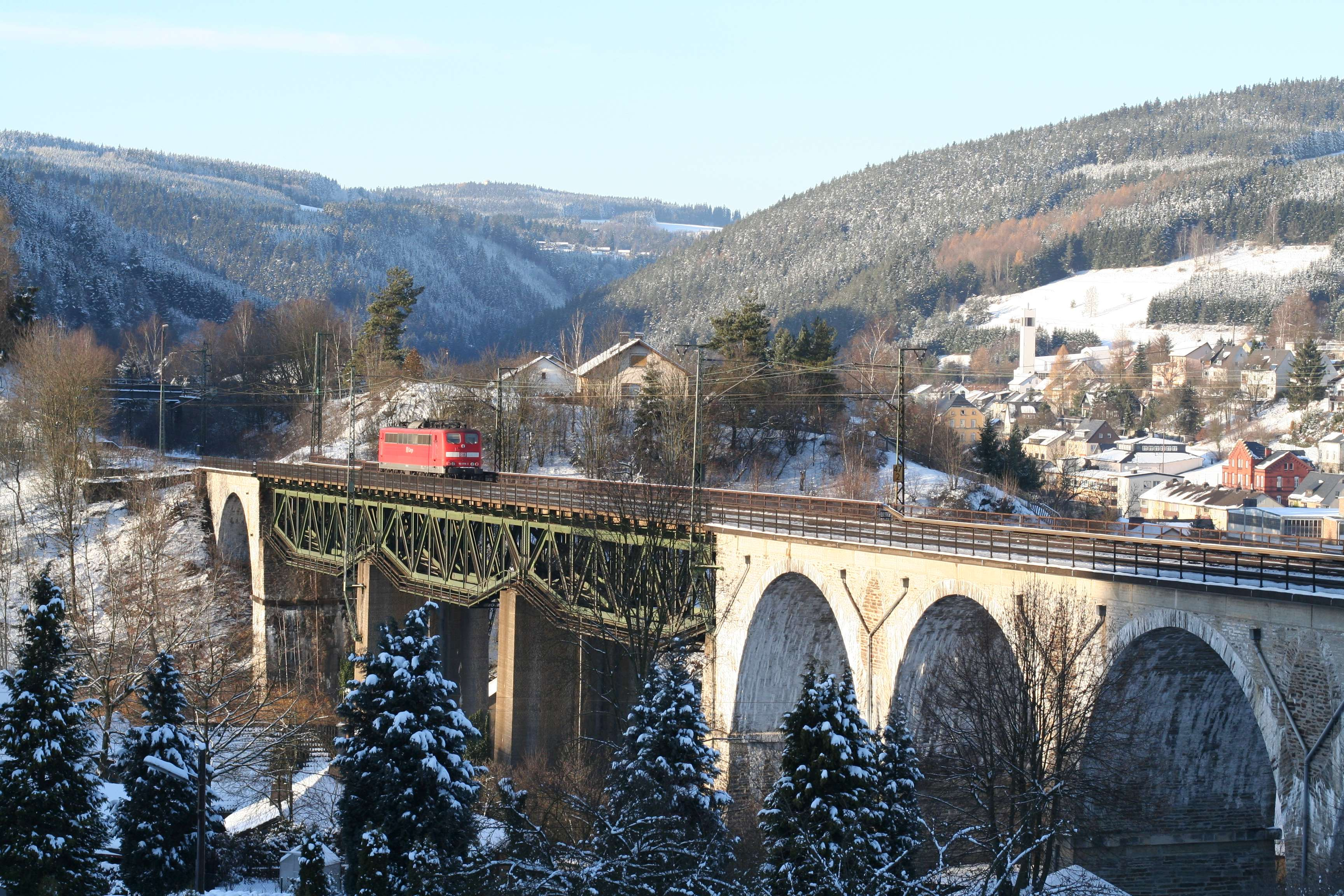
- Trogenbach Bridge Ludwigsstadt, a Class 151 banking locomotive returning to Probstzella

Overview
- Native name: Frankenwaldbahn
- Line number: 5100, 5010, 6383, 6340, 3800
- Locale: Bavaria, Thuringia, Germany

Service
- Route number: 840, 841

Technical
- Line length: 88 km (55 mi)
- Track gauge: 1,435 mm (4 ft 8 1/2 in) standard gauge
- Minimum radius: 300 m (984 ft)
- Electrification: 15 kV/16.7 Hz AC catenary
- Maximum incline: 2.9%
Route map
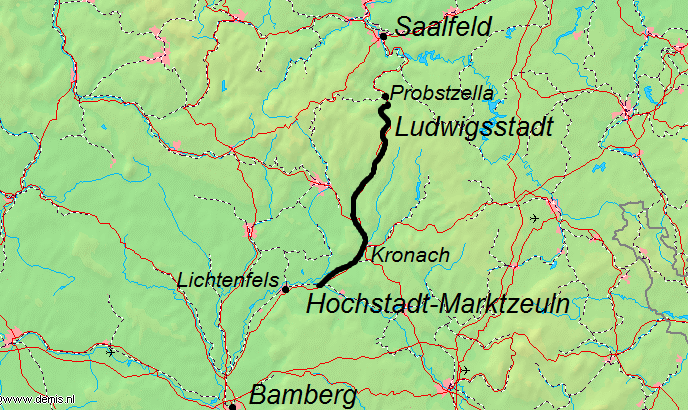
- Source: German railway atlas

The Hochstadt-Marktzeuln–Probstzella railway (also called in German the Frankenwaldbahn, "Franconian Forest Railway"), route no. KBS 840, is an 88 kilometre long, electrified, double-tracked main line from Lichtenfels via Kronach to Saalfeld. It is part of the Munich–Nuremberg–Bamberg–Jena–Halle/Leipzig–Berlin trunk route. It was completed in October 1885.

The Franconian Forest line branches off from the Ludwig South-North Railway at Marktzeuln. Climbing from Pressig-Rothenkirchen and Probstzella to Steinbach am Wald the line ascends the heights of the Franconian Forest (Frankenwald). The line has a maximum incline of 29 ‰ and, even today, heavy goods trains require an additional banking locomotive at the front or rear of the train.

== Route ==
The Franconian Forest Railway leaves the Ludwig South-North Railway, which runs through the Main Valley from Bamberg to Kulmbach, at Marktzeuln and heads into the Rodach Valley to Kronach. From there it switches to the valley of the Haßlach and follows it, getting ever narrower and steeper, to Pressig and onto the watershed between the Rhine and Elbe basins in Steinbach am Wald. Here the line reaches its highest point at 594.54 m above NN and crosses the Rennsteig in a cutting. It immediately begins its descent on the left hand side of the valley towards Ludwigsstadt, where it reaches the Loquitz. After passing the old halt of Lauenstein the line traverses the foothills of the Thuringian Slate Mountains on the left bank of the narrow river valley reaching Probstzella shortly after crossing the Bavarian-Thuringian border. Next the line follows the bends of the River Loquitz, as the valley widens, until the point where the river discharges into the Saale at Kaulsdorf. The railway accompanies the River Saale on the remaining ten kilometres to Saalfeld, crossing it once beyond Breternitz. Parallel to the railway line runs the B 173 main road from Lichtenfels to Kronach and the B85 from Kronach to Saalfeld.
