= Probstzella station =

Railway station in Probstzella, Germany

Probstzella
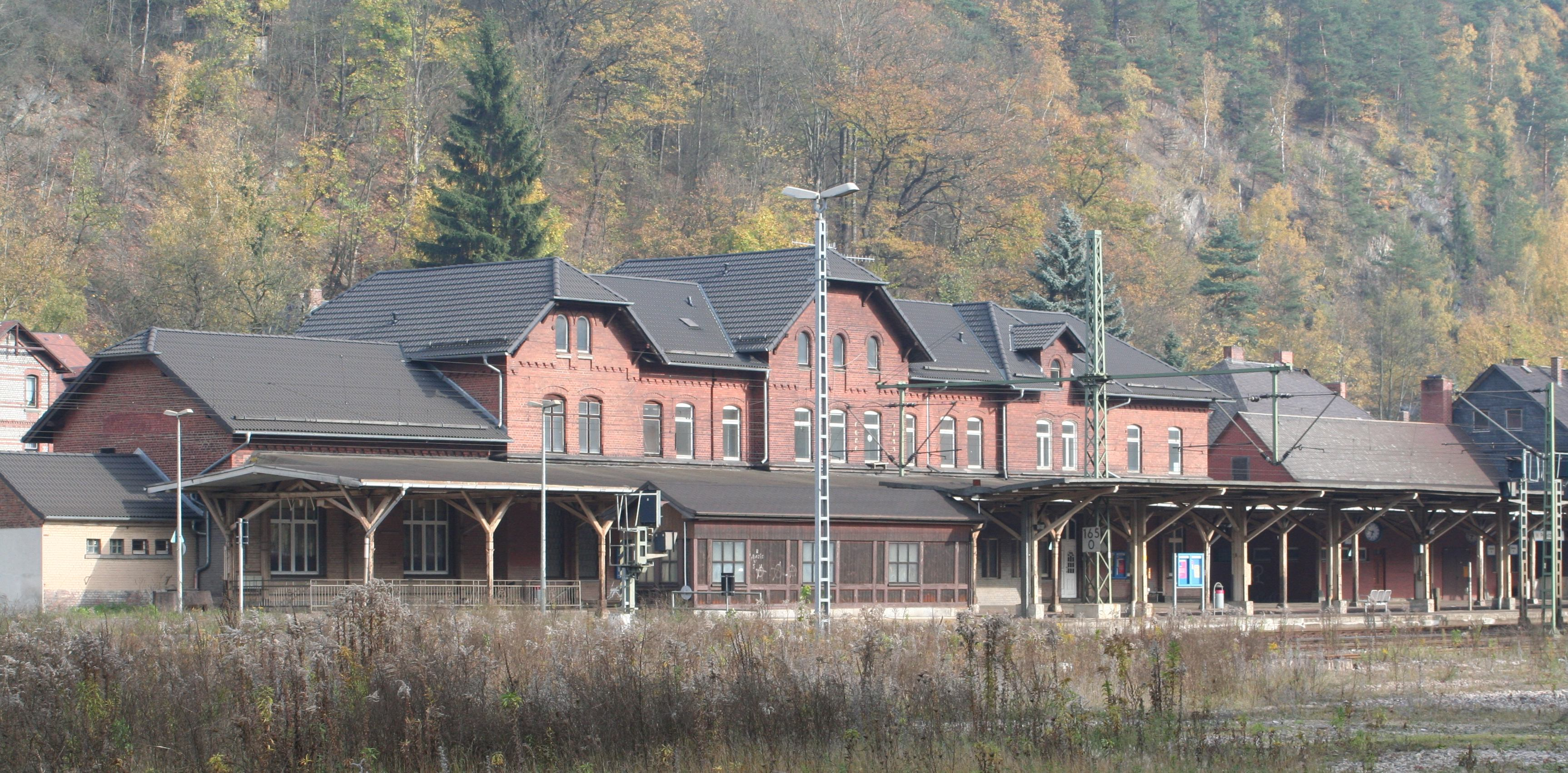

General information
- Location: Bahnhofstr. 1, Probstzella, Thuringia; Germany
- Coordinates: 50°31′41″N 11°23′2″E
- Owner: Deutsche Bahn
- Operator: DB Station&Service
- Lines: Franconian Forest Railway (KBS 840); Sonneberg–Probstzella railway
- Platforms: 3

Construction
- Accessible: No

Other information
- Station code: 5045
- DS100 code: UQPR
- IBNR: 8010288
- Category: 5
- Website: www.bahnhof.de

History
- Opened: 8 August 1885; 141 years ago
- Electrified: 1939-1946; 12 June 1950; 76 years ago

Services
Preceding station	DB Regio Bayern	Following station
Ludwigsstadt towards Nürnberg Hbf	RE 14	Unterloquitz towards Saalfeld (Saale)
Location
- Location within Thuringia

Probstzella station is the station of the Thuringian town of Probstzella in the district of Saalfeld-Rudolstadt. It is located at the southeastern edge of Probstzella and since 1 October 1885 it has been a through station on the Franconian Forest Railway. The station is 1.3 km from the Bavarian-Thuringian border and after the Second World War until German reunification in 1990, it served as the point of entry for traffic passing from West Germany to East Germany and is considered the last remaining border station on the Inner German border.

== History ==
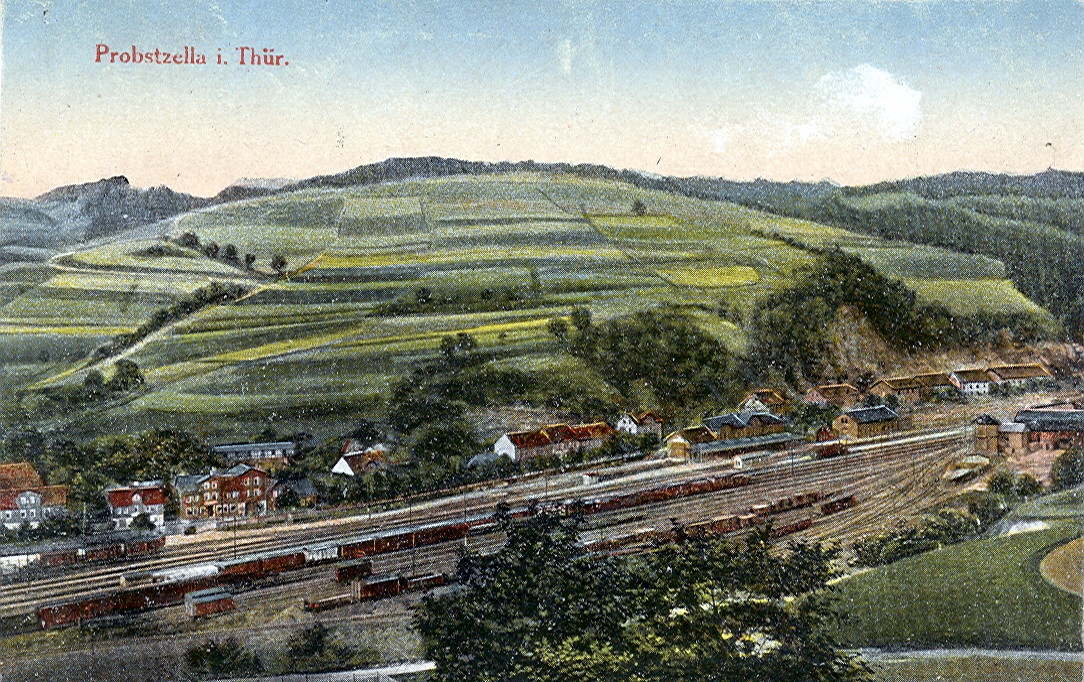
Station in 1921

The station was opened on 8 August 1885 with the completion of the section of the Franconian Forest Railway from Eichicht (now part of Kaulsdorf) to Probstzella as one of the Prussian state railways. On 1 October 1885 the Royal Bavarian State Railways opened the Ludwigsstadt–Probstzella section, completing the line from Bavaria, following the earlier opening of the Stockheim–Ludwigsstadt section. Probstzella is the southernmost station on the line in Thuringia.

The Probstzella–Schmiedefeld line opened at the end of 1898 and it was extended to Sonnenberg in 1913.

The Franconian Forest line was of great importance as the main line between Bavaria and central Germany. It was electrified on 15 May 1939. In 1939 it was served each day by two long-distance express trains, up to eleven regional express trains, two semi-fast trains and eight local trains.

In April 1945, traffic was interrupted by the Second World War, but it was soon resumed and in November 1945 the overhead lines were also restored. Continuous electrical operations between Thuringia and Bavaria were delayed due to problems in guaranteeing power supply, because Thuringia was in the Soviet occupation zone and Bavaria was in the American zone. In 1946, the overhead lines were removed in the Soviet zone for war reparations. In 1950, the section of the line from the border to Probstzella station was re-electrified so that steam locomotives did not have to run up the steep climb to Steinbach am Wald. As a result, the change point between the electrical locomotives of Deutsche Bundesbahn (DB) and the locomotives of Deutsche Reichsbahn (DR) was moved to Probstzella from Ludwigsstadt. This section was the only transition between DB and DR that was operated electrically. In addition to the locomotive transfer operations, border controls on freight trains were carried out at Probstzella and immigration formalities, which had previously been carried out on the trains, moved to Probstzella station.

The second track between Saalfeld and the border was dismantled in 1946. As a result, rail services were limited. In 1947 an express train and three freight trains ran over the border each day.

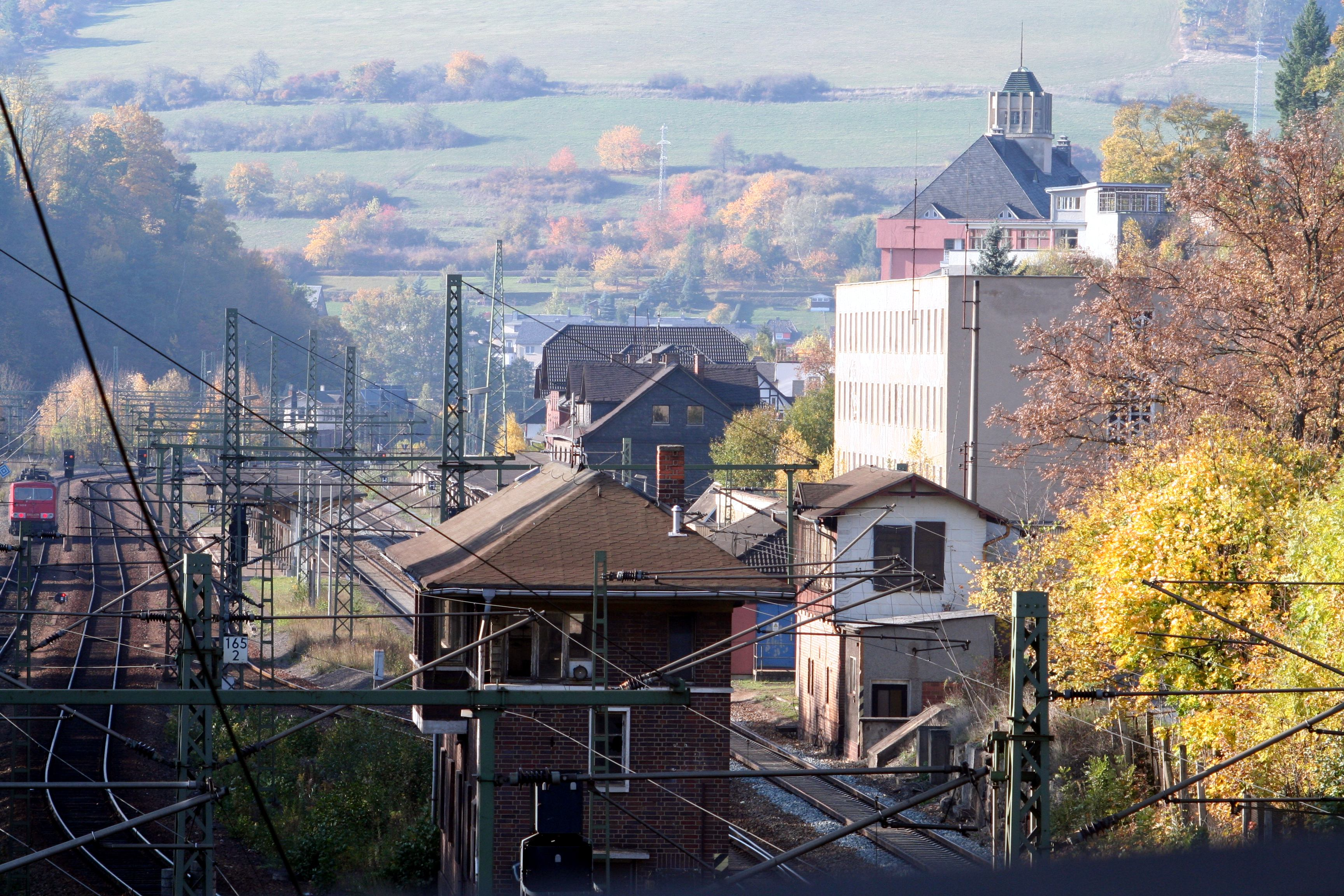
Looking north

On 20 September 1961, DR decided to build a 347 metres long connecting curve between the Franconian Forest line and the line to Sonnenberg. This had been planned since 1936, to avoid the need to reverse in Probstzella. The curve would have an advantage for border security as internal traffic would no longer have to run to the border station. On 2 October 1961, construction work began north of the station. On 9 December 1961 the new line was opened. Probstzella halt was opened on 2 November 1964 on this single-track curve. On 23 May 1993, the curve was closed.

In 1995, double track and electrification was restored on the Franconian Forest line. Since then, only regional trains stop in Probstzella. Freight trains also stop there when they need an extra locomotive to climb the ramp to Steinbach.

== Border control offices ==
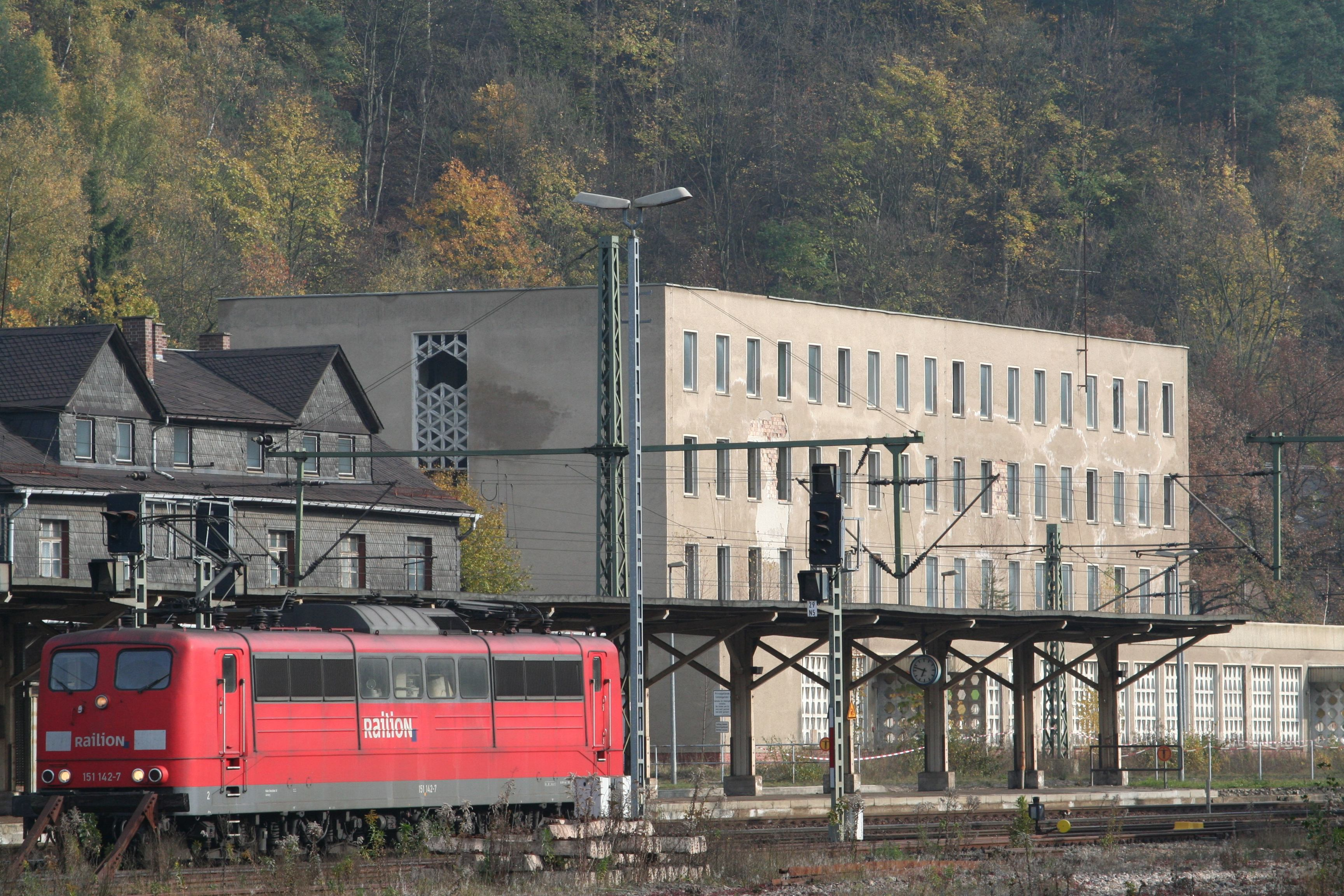
Border control offices (October 2008)

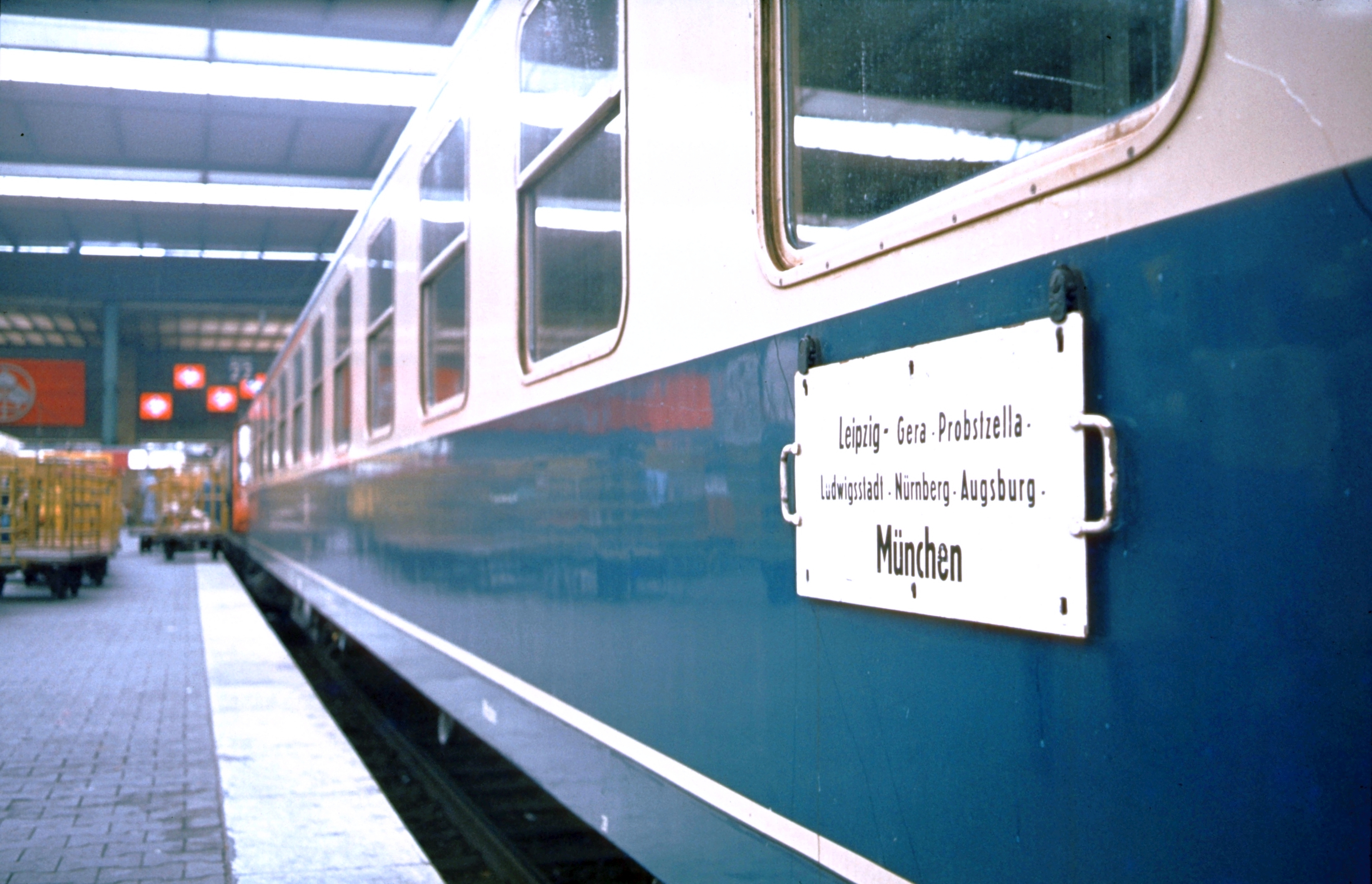
In the timetable of the GDR's Deutsche Reichsbahn (German State Railway), train connections between the Federal Republic of Germany and the GDR were listed under "International Connections." Route "L" ran from the East Berlin Friedrichstraße station via Leipzig to the Probstzella border station. From there, the Deutsche Bundesbahn continued to Nuremberg, and from there to Munich or Stuttgart. The journey time from Berlin to Munich was 10 hours and 21 minutes.

A separate building for border control was built at Probstzella station in 1976. It is a four-storey masonry building. On the ground floor of the building there were rooms for border control and a 20-metre-long “control” path, through which all those leaving had to pass. In addition, it housed the offices of the East German border troops, passport control and customs.

Since German reunification, the building has been abandoned. In May 2007, it was bought by the town of Probstzella for €3,500, with the intention of demolishing it. The Thuringian Conservation Office informed the community in August 2008 that due to its dilapidated condition it would not be heritage listed.

Historians of the period spoke out against the demolition proposal. There were plans to establish a museum in part of the former border station. In December 2008 the building was finally torn down. On 6 November 2010, a border station museum opened in the historic station building, covering the history of border controls at the border stations on the Inner German border.
