= Mitwitz (Verwaltungsgemeinschaft) =

- Verwaltungsgemeinschaft
- Location of Mitwitz within Kronach district
- Interactive map of Mitwitz
- Location within Germany Location within Bavaria
- Coordinates: 50°15′N 11°13′E
- Country: Germany
- State: Bavaria
- Admin. region: Upper Franconia
- District: Kronach
- Seat: Mitwitz
- Subdivisions: 2 municipalities

Area
  - Total: 42.5 km^{2} (16.4 sq mi)

Population (2025-12-31)
  - Total: 3,662
  - Density: 86.2/km^{2} (223/sq mi)
- Time zone: UTC+01:00 (CET)
  - Summer (DST): UTC+02:00 (CEST)
- Website: www.mitwitz.de

Mitwitz is a Verwaltungsgemeinschaft (municipal association) in the district of Kronach in Bavaria, Germany. Its seat is in Mitwitz.

It consists of the following municipalities:

1. Mitwitz
2. Schneckenlohe
