= Schneckenlohe =

- Municipality
- Coat of arms

- Location of Schneckenlohe within Kronach district
- Interactive map of Schneckenlohe
- Location within Germany Location within Bavaria
- Coordinates: 50°12′38″N 11°11′38″E
- Country: Germany
- State: Bavaria
- Admin. region: Oberfranken
- District: Kronach
- Municipal assoc.: Mitwitz
- Subdivisions: 3 Ortsteile

Government
  - Mayor (2020–26): Knut Morgenroth (SPD)

Area
  - Total: 9.31 km^{2} (3.59 sq mi)
- Elevation: 326 m (1,070 ft)

Population (2025-12-31)
  - Total: 941
  - Density: 101/km^{2} (262/sq mi)
- Time zone: UTC+01:00 (CET)
  - Summer (DST): UTC+02:00 (CEST)
- Postal codes: 96277
- Dialling codes: 09266
- Vehicle registration: KC

Schneckenlohe is a municipality in the district of Kronach in Bavaria in Germany.

== Twin towns ==
Schneckenlohe is twinned with:

- Borghetto di Vara, Italy (1993)
