= Reichenbach, Upper Franconia =

Reichenbach
- Municipality
- Coat of arms

- Location of Reichenbach within Kronach district
- Interactive map of Reichenbach
- Location within Germany Location within Bavaria
- Coordinates: 50°25′30″N 11°24′50″E
- Country: Germany
- State: Bavaria
- Admin. region: Oberfranken
- District: Kronach
- Municipal assoc.: Teuschnitz (Verwaltungsgemeinschaft)

Government
  - Mayor (2020–26): Karin Ritter (SPD)

Area
  - Total: 8.66 km^{2} (3.34 sq mi)
- Elevation: 610 m (2,000 ft)

Population (2025-12-31)
  - Total: 649
  - Density: 74.9/km^{2} (194/sq mi)
- Time zone: UTC+01:00 (CET)
  - Summer (DST): UTC+02:00 (CEST)
- Postal codes: 96358
- Dialling codes: 09268
- Vehicle registration: KC

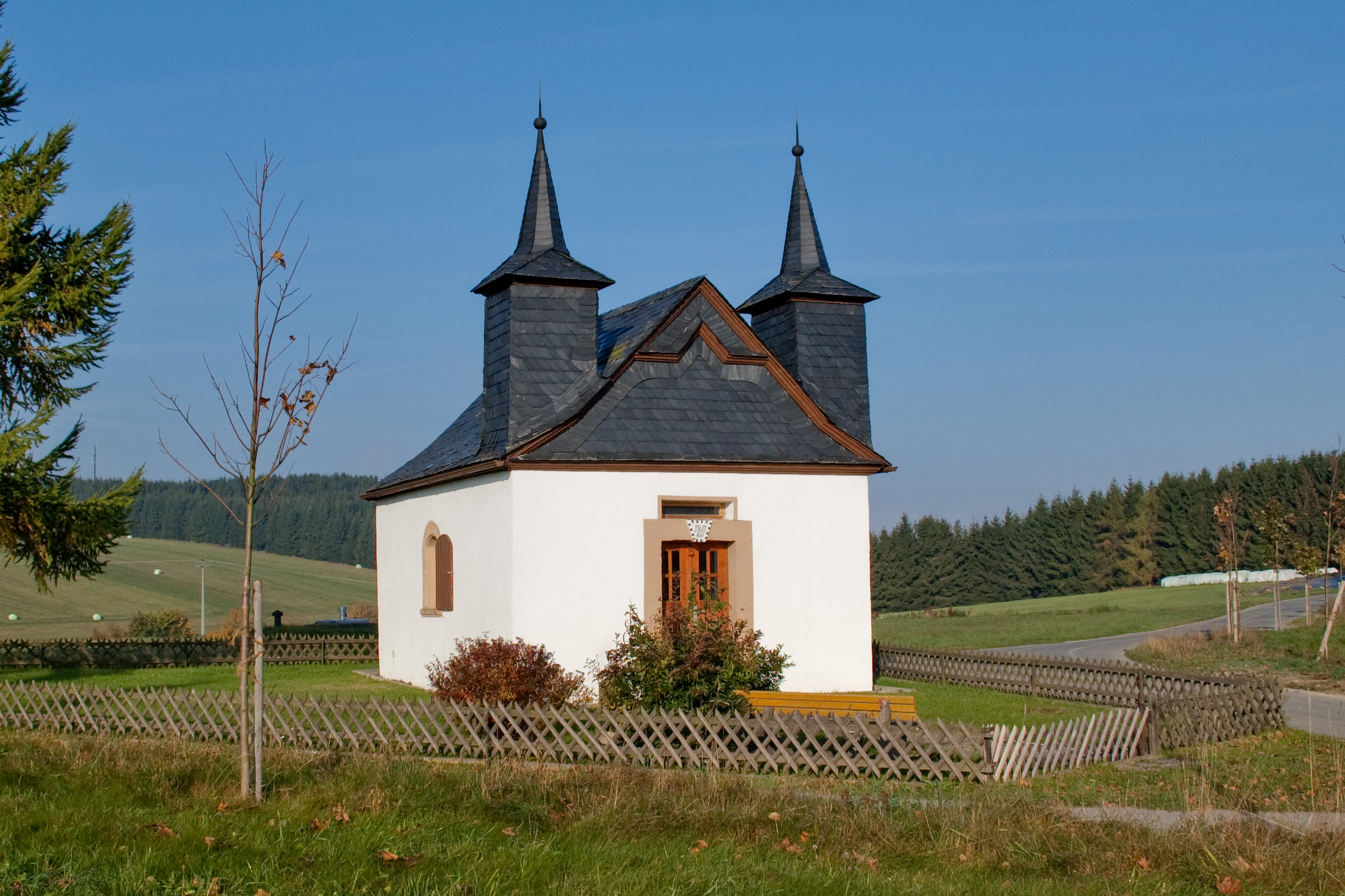
Chapel St. Mariae

Reichenbach (German pronunciation: [ˈʁaɪçn̩bax]) is a municipality in the district of Kronach in Bavaria in Germany.
