= Otto Goritz =

German opera singer

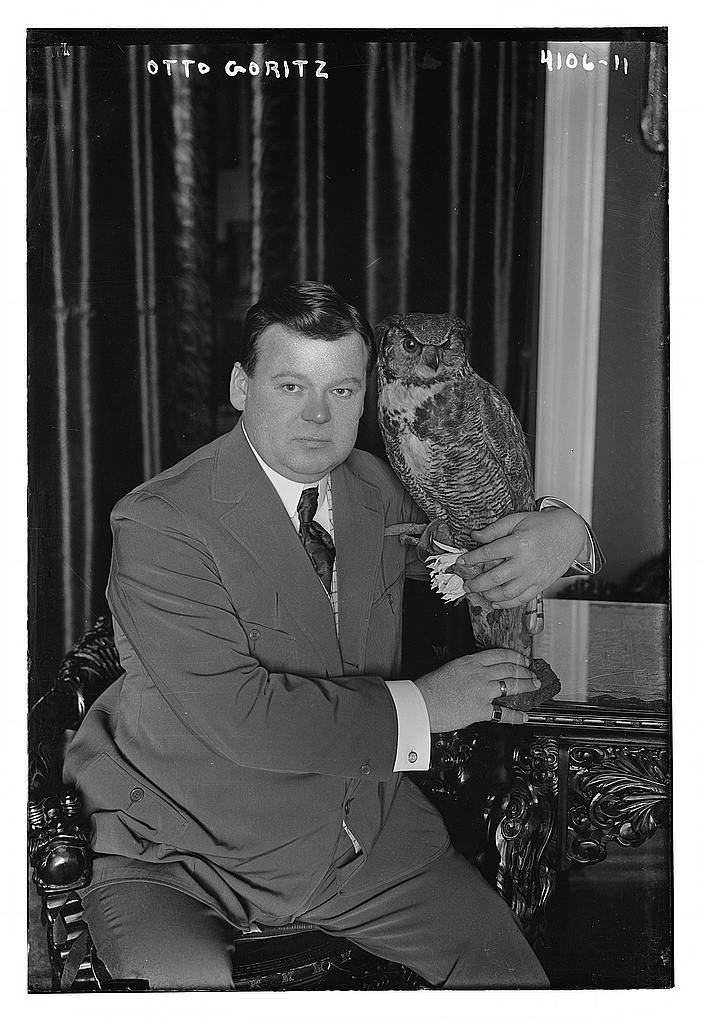
Goritz with an owl in 1916

Otto Goritz (June 8, 1872 - April 13, 1929) was a German baritone with the Metropolitan Opera from 1903 to 1917. He then sang for the Hamburg State Opera.

== Biography ==
Goritz was born in 1872 in Berlin, Germany. Trained only by his mother, Olga Neilitz Goritz, Goritz debuted as Matteo in "Fra Diavolo" in 1895 at the Court Theatre in Neustrelitz, then sang at opera houses in Breslau and Hamburg.

In 1903, Goritz immigrated to the United States, where he sang with the Metropolitan Opera in New York City from 1903 to 1917. He performed in 25 roles at the Metropolitan, 24 of them in German and 1 in Italian. After the USA entered World War I in 1917, the Metropolitan Opera suspended performances of works from the German repertory. Goritz was either fired or forced to resign from the Met after having been rumored to have sung a parody celebrating the 1915 sinking of the RMS Lusitania at a New Year's Eve party hosted by Met soprano Johanna Gadski in 1916 (Gadski also was forced out of the Met around the same time due to the war and her German links). Goritz nevertheless remained in New York City. In late 1919, he organized the Star Opera Company and attempted to stage German operas at the Lexington Opera House in New York City. The American Legion gathered 23,000 signatures in protest of Goritz and his company; after a riot broke out on opening night, the company was forced to disband. In 1920, Goritz returned to Germany, where he continued to sing with the Hamburg State Opera. He died on April 13, 1929, in Hamburg.

== Recordings ==
In the 1910s, Goritz made a number of recordings for Columbia Records, Edison Records, the Victor Talking Machine Company, and other companies. Some of them are available today on compact disc.
