= Wetzstein (Hesse) =

Mountain in Germany

Highest point
- Elevation: 358 m (1,175 ft)
- Coordinates: 50°53′31″N 9°1′33″E

Geography
- Location: Hesse, Germany

Wetzstein is a low mountain of Hesse, Germany. It is located north of Stadtallendorf and west of Schwalmstadt.
