= Pressig =

- Municipality
- Coat of arms

- Location of Pressig within Kronach district
- Interactive map of Pressig
- Location within Germany Location within Bavaria
- Coordinates: 50°20′44″N 11°18′34″E
- Country: Germany
- State: Bavaria
- Admin. region: Oberfranken
- District: Kronach
- Subdivisions: 10 Ortsteile

Government
  - Mayor (2020–26): Stefan Heinlein (CSU)

Area
  - Total: 53.19 km^{2} (20.54 sq mi)
- Elevation: 372 m (1,220 ft)

Population (2025-12-31)
  - Total: 3,835
  - Density: 72.10/km^{2} (186.7/sq mi)
- Time zone: UTC+01:00 (CET)
  - Summer (DST): UTC+02:00 (CEST)
- Postal codes: 96332
- Dialling codes: 09265
- Vehicle registration: KC
- Website: www.pressig.de

Pressig (German pronunciation: [ˈpʁɛsɪç]) is a municipality in the district of Kronach, administrative region Upper Franconia, in Bavaria in Germany.
