= Marktrodach =

- Municipality
- Coat of arms

- Location of Marktrodach within Kronach district
- Interactive map of Marktrodach
- Location within Germany Location within Bavaria
- Coordinates: 50°14′58″N 11°23′09″E
- Country: Germany
- State: Bavaria
- Admin. region: Oberfranken
- District: Kronach
- Subdivisions: 16 Ortsteile

Government
  - Mayor (2020–26): Norbert Gräbner

Area
  - Total: 33.22 km^{2} (12.83 sq mi)
- Elevation: 340 m (1,120 ft)

Population (2025-12-31)
  - Total: 3,512
  - Density: 105.7/km^{2} (273.8/sq mi)
- Time zone: UTC+01:00 (CET)
  - Summer (DST): UTC+02:00 (CEST)
- Postal codes: 96364
- Dialling codes: 09261
- Vehicle registration: KC
- Website: marktrodach.de

Marktrodach is a municipality in the district of Kronach in Bavaria in Germany.
