= Wetzstein (Thuringia) =

Mountain in Franconian Forest, Germany

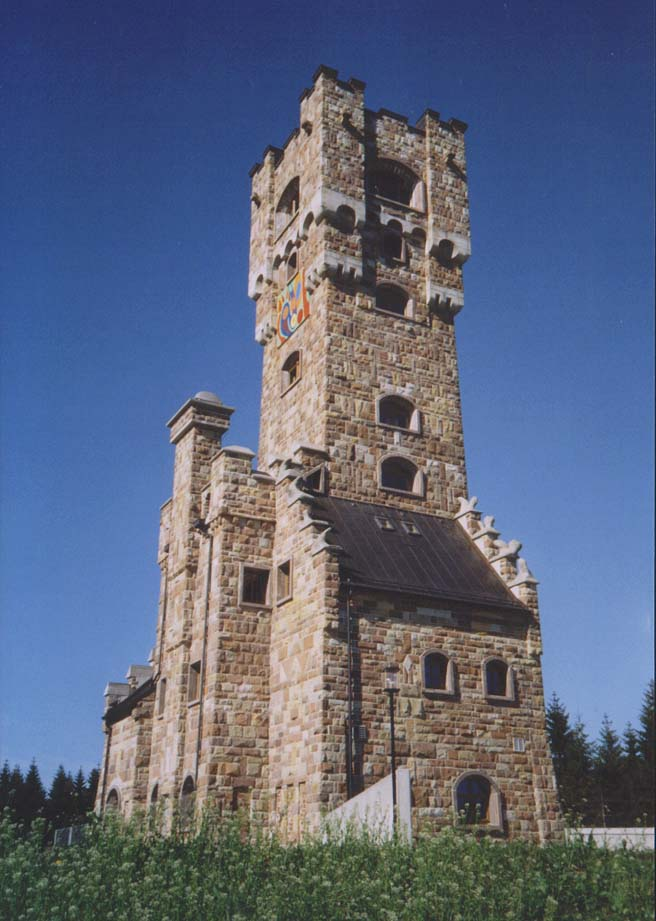
- The Altvaterturm on the Wetzstein summit

Highest point
- Elevation: 792 m (2,598 ft)
- Prominence: 153 m (502 ft)
- Coordinates: 50°27′0″N 11°27′20″E

Geography
- Location: Thuringian Highland, Germany

Wetzstein is a mountain of southeastern Thuringia, Germany, part of the Thuringian Highland. It is located south of Lehesten. In 2004 the Altvaterturm was built on the summit, as a replica of the tower that stood on the mountain Praděd (German: Altvater, northeastern Czech Republic) until 1959.
