= Teuschnitz =

- Town
- Coat of arms

- Location of Teuschnitz within Kronach district
- Interactive map of Teuschnitz
- Location within Germany Location within Bavaria
- Coordinates: 50°23′45″N 11°22′50″E
- Country: Germany
- State: Bavaria
- Admin. region: Oberfranken
- District: Kronach
- Municipal assoc.: Teuschnitz (Verwaltungsgemeinschaft)
- Subdivisions: 3 Ortsteile

Government
  - Mayor (2020–26): Frank Jakob (FW)

Area
  - Total: 34.26 km^{2} (13.23 sq mi)
- Elevation: 614 m (2,014 ft)

Population (2025-12-31)
  - Total: 1,827
  - Density: 53.33/km^{2} (138.1/sq mi)
- Time zone: UTC+01:00 (CET)
  - Summer (DST): UTC+02:00 (CEST)
- Postal codes: 96358
- Dialling codes: 09268
- Vehicle registration: KC
- Website: www.teuschnitz.de

Teuschnitz (German: [ˈtɔɪʃ.nɪt͡s]) is a town in the district of Kronach, in Bavaria, Germany. It is situated in the Franconian Forest, 19 km north of Kronach, and 15 km east of Sonneberg.

== History ==
The earliest record on Teuschnitz is from 1187, when the Bishop Otto II gave it to the Langheim Monastery. Between 1250 and 1329, the town was given market rights.
