= Tschirn =

- Municipality
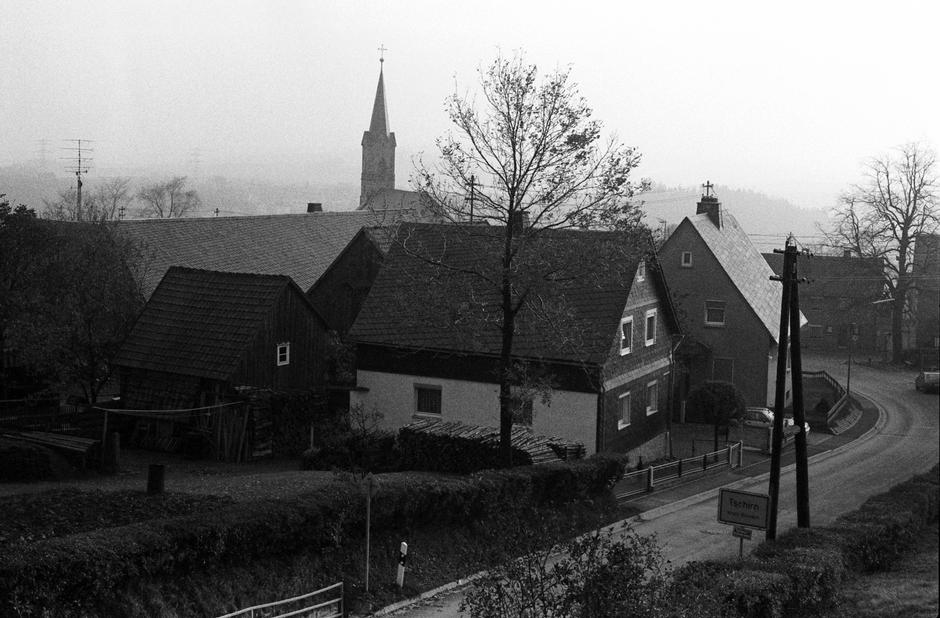

- Coat of arms

- Location of Tschirn within Kronach district
- Interactive map of Tschirn
- Location within Germany Location within Bavaria
- Coordinates: 50°23′49″N 11°26′59″E
- Country: Germany
- State: Bavaria
- Admin. region: Oberfranken
- District: Kronach
- Municipal assoc.: Teuschnitz (Verwaltungsgemeinschaft)
- Subdivisions: 3 Ortsteile

Government
  - Mayor (2020–26): Peter Klinger (CSU)

Area
  - Total: 20.14 km^{2} (7.78 sq mi)
- Elevation: 598 m (1,962 ft)

Population (2025-12-31)
  - Total: 499
  - Density: 24.8/km^{2} (64.2/sq mi)
- Time zone: UTC+01:00 (CET)
  - Summer (DST): UTC+02:00 (CEST)
- Postal codes: 96367
- Dialling codes: 09268
- Vehicle registration: KC
- Website: www.tschirn-online.de

Tschirn (German pronunciation: [tʃɪʁn]) is a municipality in the district of Kronach in Oberfranken (Bavaria, Germany). Located in the Franconian Forest range, it incorporates the sections Tschirn, Dobermühle and Gemeindeschneidmühle. The oldest historical record dates 1276.
