= Steinbach am Wald =

Steinbach a.Wald
- Municipality
- Coat of arms

- Location of Steinbach a.Wald within Kronach district
- Interactive map of Steinbach a.Wald
- Location within Germany Location within Bavaria
- Coordinates: 50°25′57″N 11°21′39″E
- Country: Germany
- State: Bavaria
- Admin. region: Oberfranken
- District: Kronach
- Subdivisions: 9 Ortsteile

Government
  - Mayor (2023–29): Thomas Löffler (CSU)

Area
  - Total: 35.47 km^{2} (13.70 sq mi)
- Elevation: 584 m (1,916 ft)

Population (2025-12-31)
  - Total: 2,976
  - Density: 83.90/km^{2} (217.3/sq mi)
- Time zone: UTC+01:00 (CET)
  - Summer (DST): UTC+02:00 (CEST)
- Postal codes: 96361
- Dialling codes: 09263, 09268, 09269
- Vehicle registration: KC
- Website: www.steinbach-am-wald.de

Steinbach is a municipality in the district of Kronach in Bavaria in Germany.

== History ==
The village was first mentioned in 1190. Until 1388 it was part of 'Eygen Teuschnitz', a large estate of Langheim monastery.

== Economy ==
Biggest employer is Wiegand-Glas with branches in Großbreitenbach, Slovakia and South Africa.

== Events ==
Every July, an association called "Zechgemeinschaft" celebrates the traditional fair. Unmarried young people dress themselves with the traditional clothes of the village and invite their guests to dance with them to typical music. In August, the rifle club's festival takes place.
