= Ludwigsstadt =

- Town
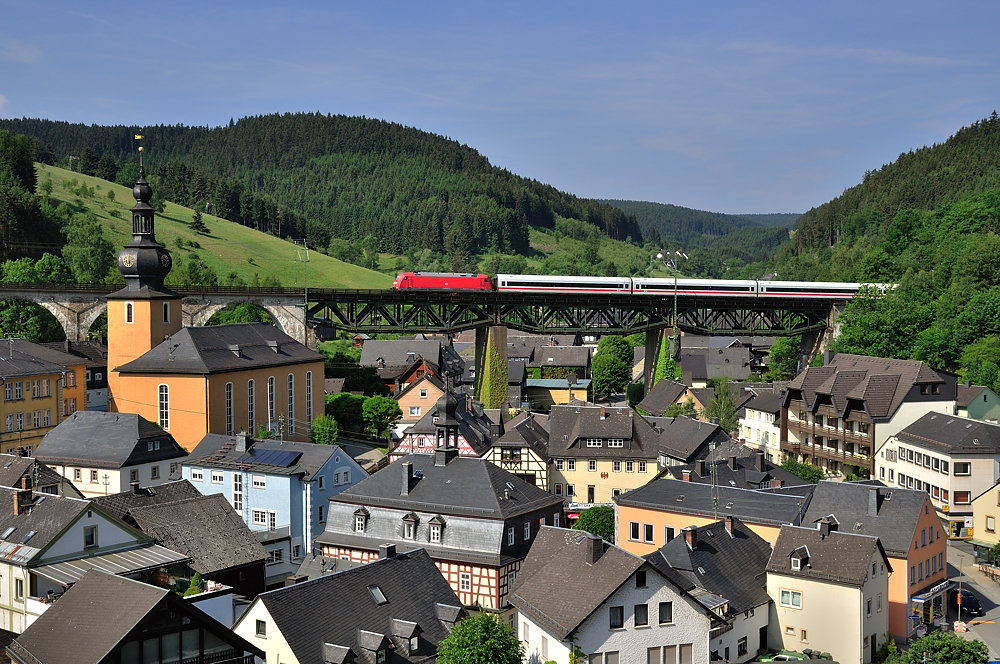
- DB train passing Trogenbach viaduct

- Coat of arms

- Location of Ludwigsstadt within Kronach district
- Interactive map of Ludwigsstadt
- Location within Germany Location within Bavaria
- Coordinates: 50°29′09″N 11°23′15″E
- Country: Germany
- State: Bavaria
- Admin. region: Oberfranken
- District: Kronach
- Subdivisions: 5 Ortsteile

Government
  - Mayor (2020–26): Timo Ehrhardt (SPD)

Area
  - Total: 58.72 km^{2} (22.67 sq mi)
- Elevation: 446 m (1,463 ft)

Population (2025-12-31)
  - Total: 2,989
  - Density: 50.90/km^{2} (131.8/sq mi)
- Time zone: UTC+01:00 (CET)
  - Summer (DST): UTC+02:00 (CEST)
- Postal codes: 96337
- Dialling codes: 09263
- Vehicle registration: KC
- Website: www.ludwigsstadt.de

Ludwigsstadt is a town in the district of Kronach, in the Upper Franconian region of Bavaria, Germany.

== Geography ==
It is situated in the valley of the Loquitz River, a tributary of the Saale, in the Thuringian-Franconian Highlands of the Thuringian Slate Mountains and the Franconian Forest mountain ranges. Located 28 kilometres (17 mi) north of Kronach, the Bavarian border with the state of Thuringia runs about 3 km (1.9 mi) north of the town centre, with Thuringian Saalfeld in a distance of c. 18 km (11 mi) down the Loquitz. Ludwigsstadt is the only municipality of the State of Bavaria located north of the Rennsteig ridge.

It is the second-northernmost town in Bavaria, behind Fladungen.

== History ==
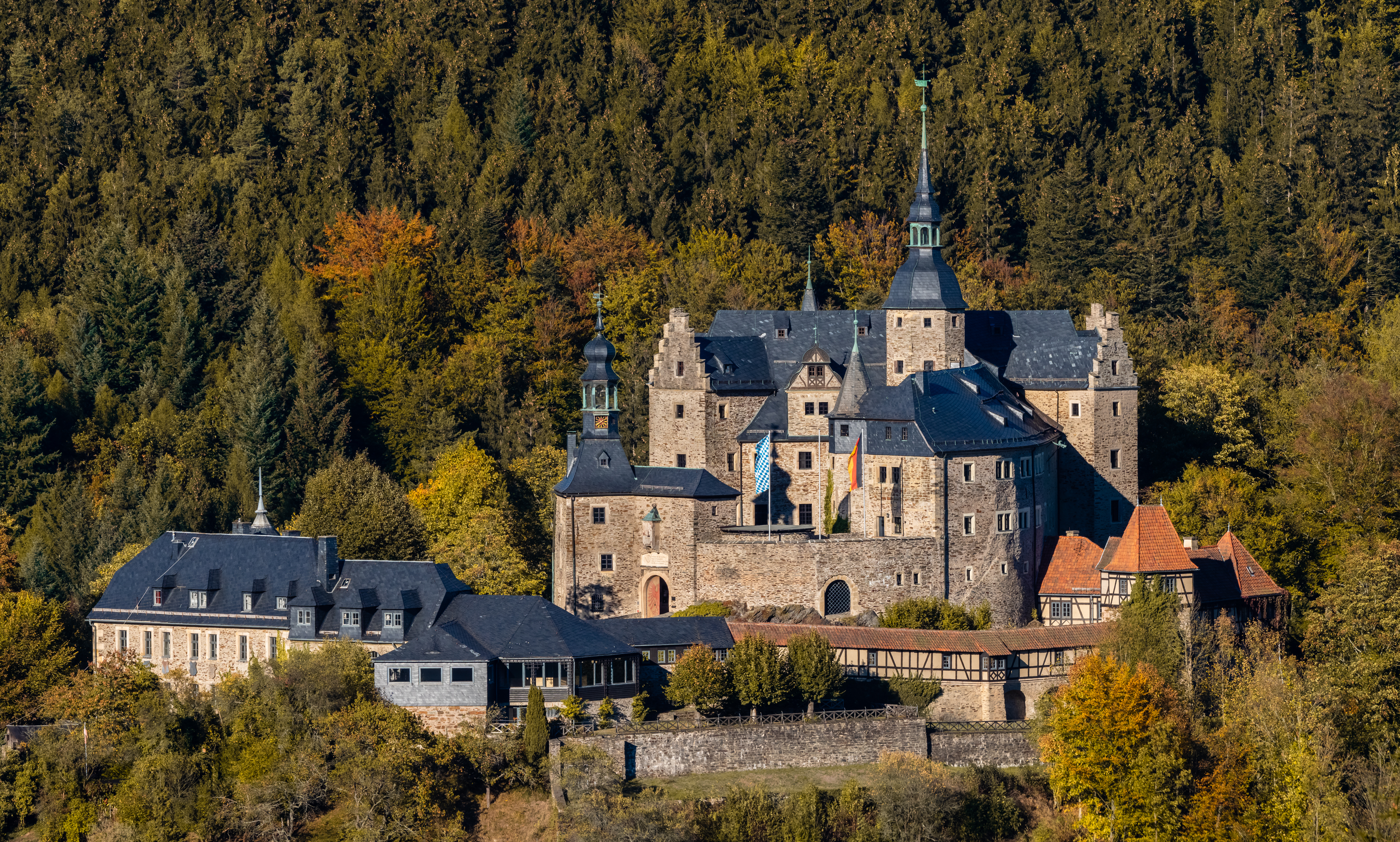
Lauenstein Castle

The settlement in the Landgraviate of Thuringia was first mentioned in a 1269 deed as Ludwichsdorf, probably named after a local Vogt official of the Counts of Weimar-Orlamünde. In 1427 the area around historic Lauenstein Castle was acquired by the Hohenzollern Elector Frederick I of Brandenburg, who added it as a northern exclave to his Franconian Principality of Kulmbach. Ludwigsstadt received town privileges in 1490, which it again lost in 1525, as the citizens joined a rebellion against the landlords during the German Peasants' War.

In 1622 Margrave Christian of Brandenburg-Bayreuth, colonel of the Imperial Franconian Circle, finally purchased Ludwigsstadt. When his descendant Margrave Charles Alexander resigned in 1791, he sold his possessions to his Hohenzollern relatives in the Kingdom of Prussia. In the course of the German Mediatisation in 1803, Ludwigsstadt fell to the Electorate of Bavaria.

== Transport ==
In 1885 Ludwigsstadt achieved access to the Franconian Forest Railway line, connecting the Bavarian Ludwig South-North Railway near Lichtenfels with the Thuringian Saal Railway at Saalfeld. It soon evolved to one of the most important north–south railway connections in Germany, linking the Prussian capital Berlin with Nuremberg and Munich.

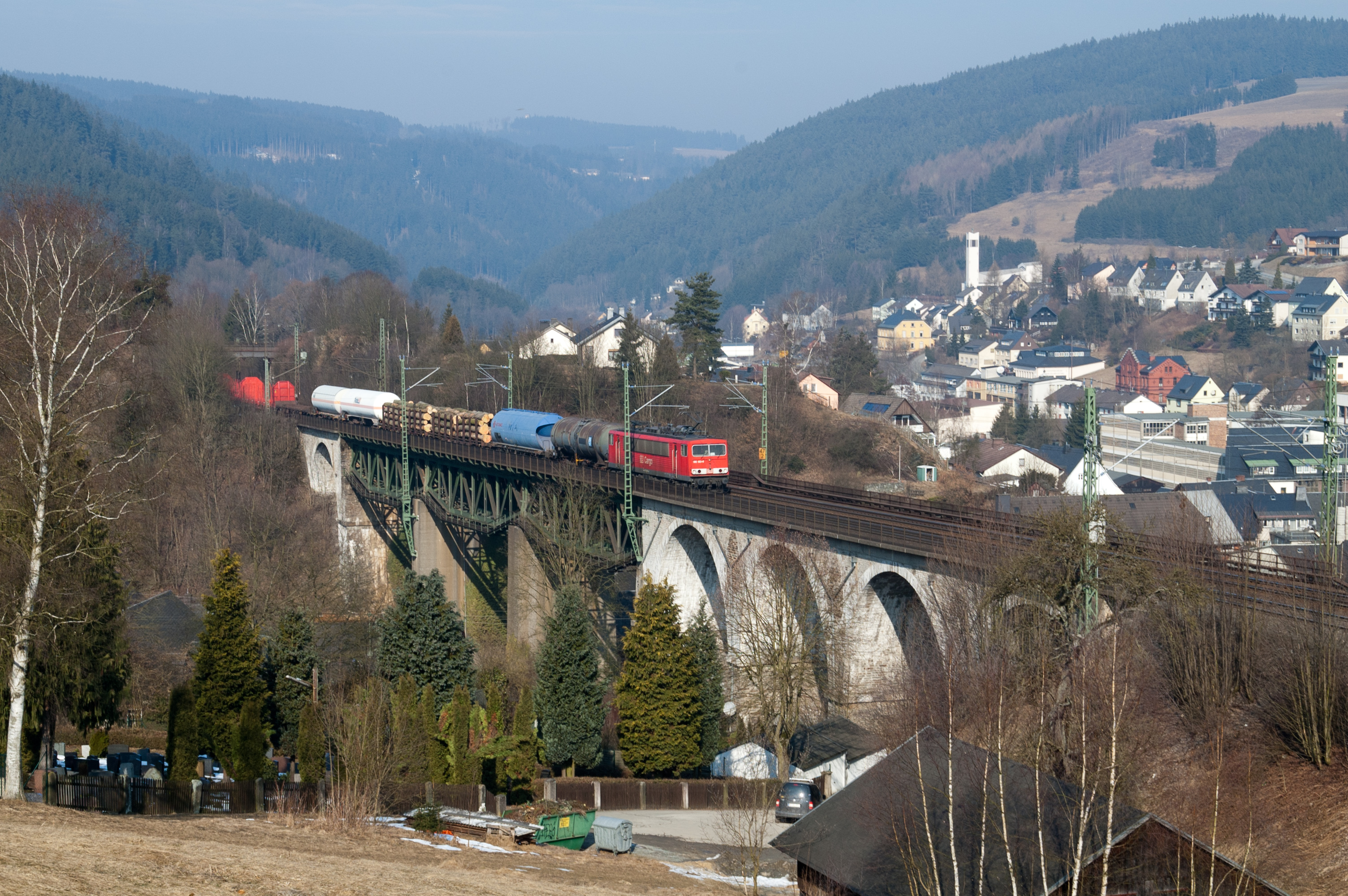
Freight train on ascent to the Rennsteig

Between 1945 and 1990 Ludwigsstadt station served as West German checkpoint for crossing the inner German border by rail with its counterpart at Probstzella station. The border crossing was open for trains travelling from West to East Germany or West Berlin. The traffic was subject to the interzonal traffic regulations, that regarding trains between West Germany and West Berlin followed the special regulations of the Transit Agreement (1972).

After German Reunification, the railway was restored.
