= Küps =

- Municipality
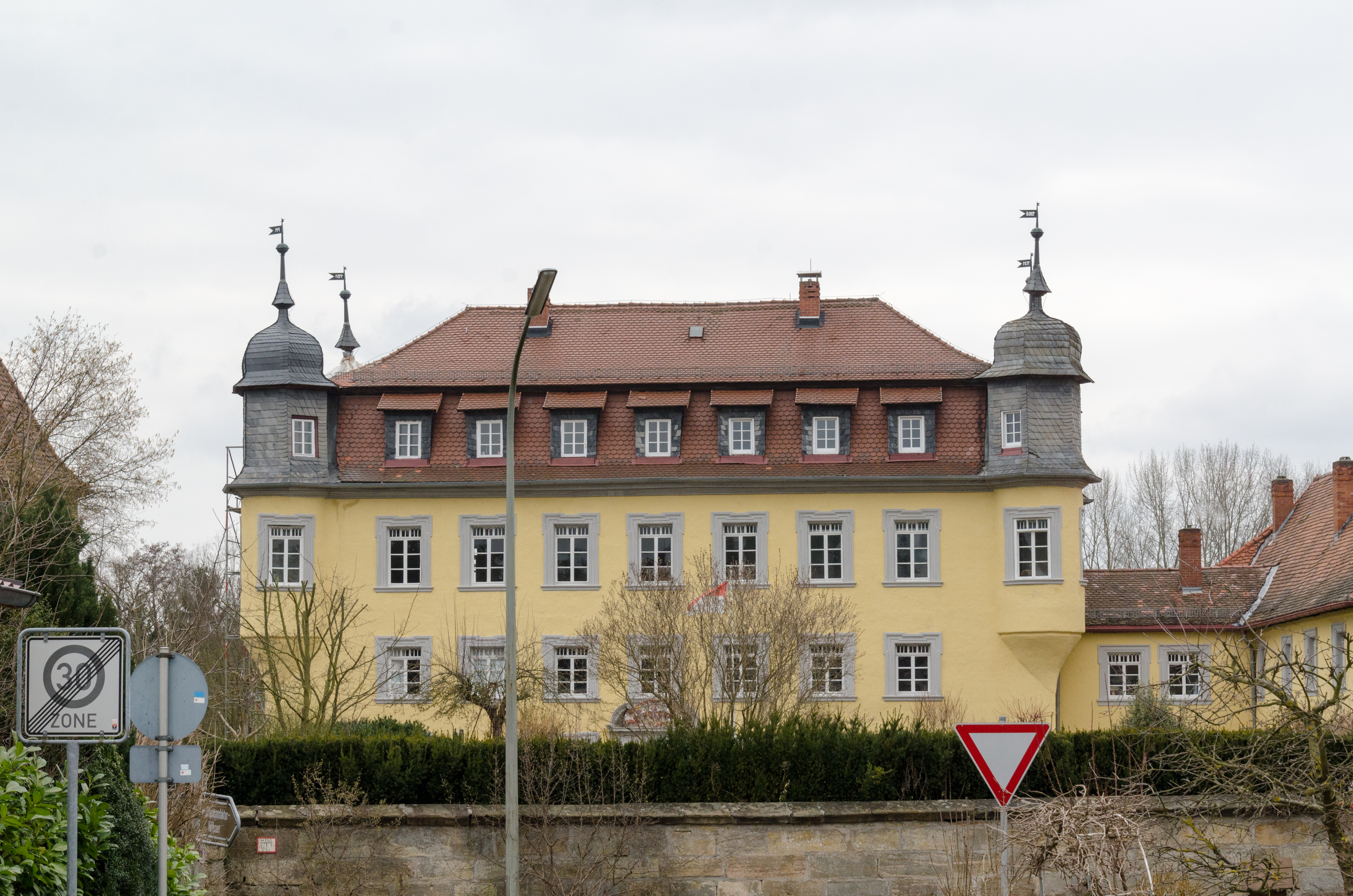
- New Palace in Küps

- Coat of arms

- Location of Küps within Kronach district
- Interactive map of Küps
- Location within Germany Location within Bavaria
- Coordinates: 50°11′36″N 11°16′22″E
- Country: Germany
- State: Bavaria
- Admin. region: Oberfranken
- District: Kronach
- Subdivisions: 9 Ortsteile

Government
  - Mayor (2023–29): Bernd Rebhan (CSU)

Area
  - Total: 35.64 km^{2} (13.76 sq mi)
- Elevation: 299 m (981 ft)

Population (2025-12-31)
  - Total: 7,663
  - Density: 215.0/km^{2} (556.9/sq mi)
- Time zone: UTC+01:00 (CET)
  - Summer (DST): UTC+02:00 (CEST)
- Postal codes: 96328
- Dialling codes: 09264, 09261
- Vehicle registration: KC
- Website: www.kueps.de

Küps is a municipality in the district of Kronach in Upper Franconia in Bavaria in Germany located along the Bavarian Porcelain Route.

== Industry ==
- Brütting (1946)
- Lindner Porzellan (1931)
