= Kronach (district) =

Coordinates: 50°20′N 11°20′E

- District
- Flag Coat of arms
- Country: Germany
- State: Bavaria
- Adm. region: Upper Franconia
- Capital: Kronach

Government
  - District admin.: Klaus Löffler (CSU)

Area
  - Total: 651 km^{2} (251 sq mi)

Population (31 December 2025)
  - Total: 63,806
  - Density: 98.0/km^{2} (254/sq mi)
- Time zone: UTC+01:00 (CET)
  - Summer (DST): UTC+02:00 (CEST)
- Vehicle registration: KC, SAN
- Website: landkreis-kronach.de

Kronach is a Landkreis (district) in Bavaria, Germany. It is bounded by (from the east and clockwise) the districts of Hof, Kulmbach, Lichtenfels and Coburg, and the state of Thuringia (districts of Sonneberg, Saalfeld-Rudolstadt and Saale-Orla).

== History ==
Kronach was ruled by the bishopric of Bamberg from 1102 until 1803, when the clerical states of Germany were dissolved. Afterwards it fell to Bavaria, where the districts of Kronach and Teuschnitz were established on the territory of the present district. In 1931, these districts were merged to form the district of Kronach.

== Geography ==
A large portion of the district is part of the Franconian Forest nature park. The Franconian Forest (German Frankenwald) is a hill chain rising to 795 metres (2,608 ft) To the southwest the country is sloping away. Several narrow rivers run southwards through the district in order to join the river Main beyond the district's borders, among them the Kronach.

== Coat of arms ==
The coat of arms displays:

- the heraldic lion of Bamberg
- the heraldic lion of Orlamünde (a Thuringian family owning Lauenstein castle in the very north of the district)
- the wheel symbolising watermills in the rivers of the district

== Towns and municipalities ==
Clickable map of towns and municipalities in the district

Towns
1. Kronach
2. Ludwigsstadt
3. Wallenfels
Märkte
1. Küps
2. Marktrodach
3. Nordhalben
4. Pressig
5. Steinwiesen
6. Tettau
Municipalities

$Steinbach am Wald

1. Stockheim
2. Weißenbrunn
3. Wilhelmsthal

Verwaltungsgemeinschaften
| 1. Mitwitz; 1. Mitwitz^{1,3}; 2. Schneckenlohe | 2. Teuschnitz; 1. Reichenbach; 2. Teuschnitz^{1,2}; 3. Tschirn |
^{1}seat of the Verwaltungsgemeinschaft; ^{2}town; ^{3}Markt
