= Steinach (Rodach) =

River in Germany

- The Steinach in Oberlind, a borough of Sonneberg

Location
- Country: Germany
- States: Thuringia and Bavaria

Physical characteristics
- Mouth
  - location: Rodach
  - coordinates: 50.1739°N 11.1906°E
- Length: 53.1 km (33.0 mi)
- Basin size: 286 km^{2} (110 sq mi)

Basin features
- Progression: Rodach→ Main→ Rhine→ North Sea

Steinach (German pronunciation: [ˈʃtaɪnax]) is a river of Thuringia and Bavaria, Germany. Its source is near Neuhaus am Rennweg, and it flows to the south, passing through the towns Steinach and Sonneberg. It is a right tributary of the Rodach, which it joins near Redwitz an der Rodach. It is a popular hiking area for locals.

== See also ==
- List of rivers of Thuringia
- List of rivers of Bavaria
