= Haßlach =

River in Germany

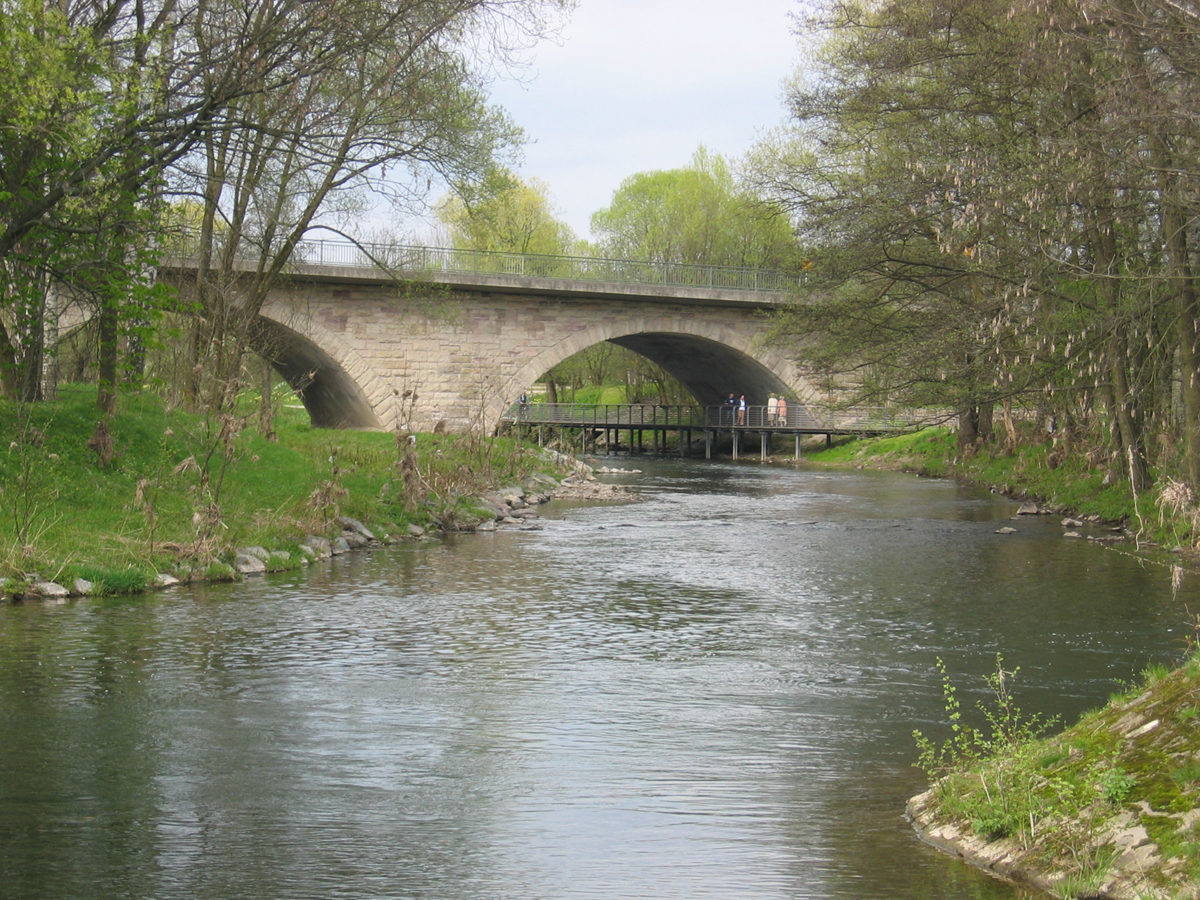
- The Haßlach in Kronach

Location
- Country: Germany
- State: Bavaria

Physical characteristics
- Mouth
  - location: Rodach
  - coordinates: 50.2275°N 11.3161°E
- Length: 31.2 km (19.4 mi)
- Basin size: 321 km^{2} (124 sq mi)

Basin features
- Progression: Rodach→ Main→ Rhine→ North Sea

The Haßlach (German pronunciation: [ˈhaslax]; alternative spelling: Hasslach) is a river in the Upper Franconian region of Landkreis Kronach in Bavaria, Germany. The 31.2 km long Haßlach flows into the Rodach River in the town of Kronach.

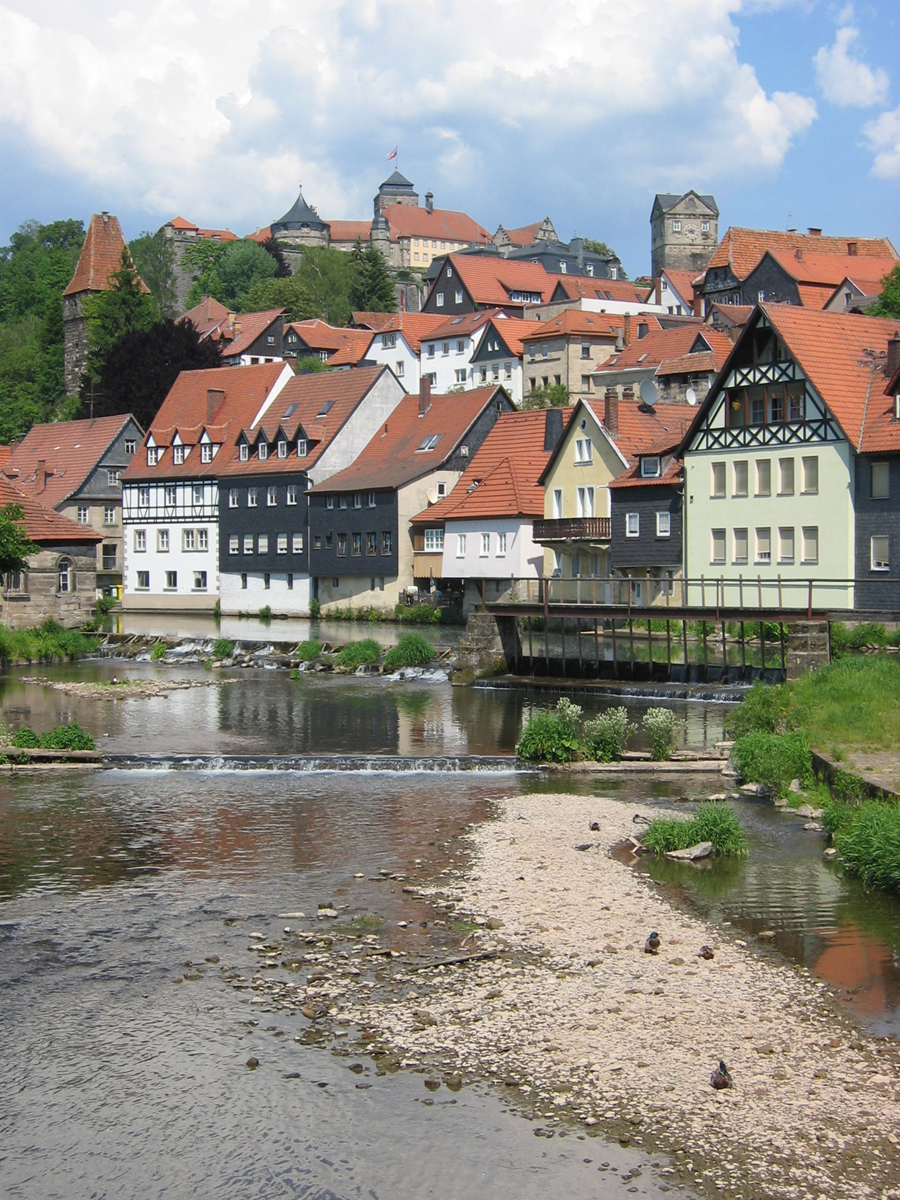
The Haßlach at a weir in Kronach

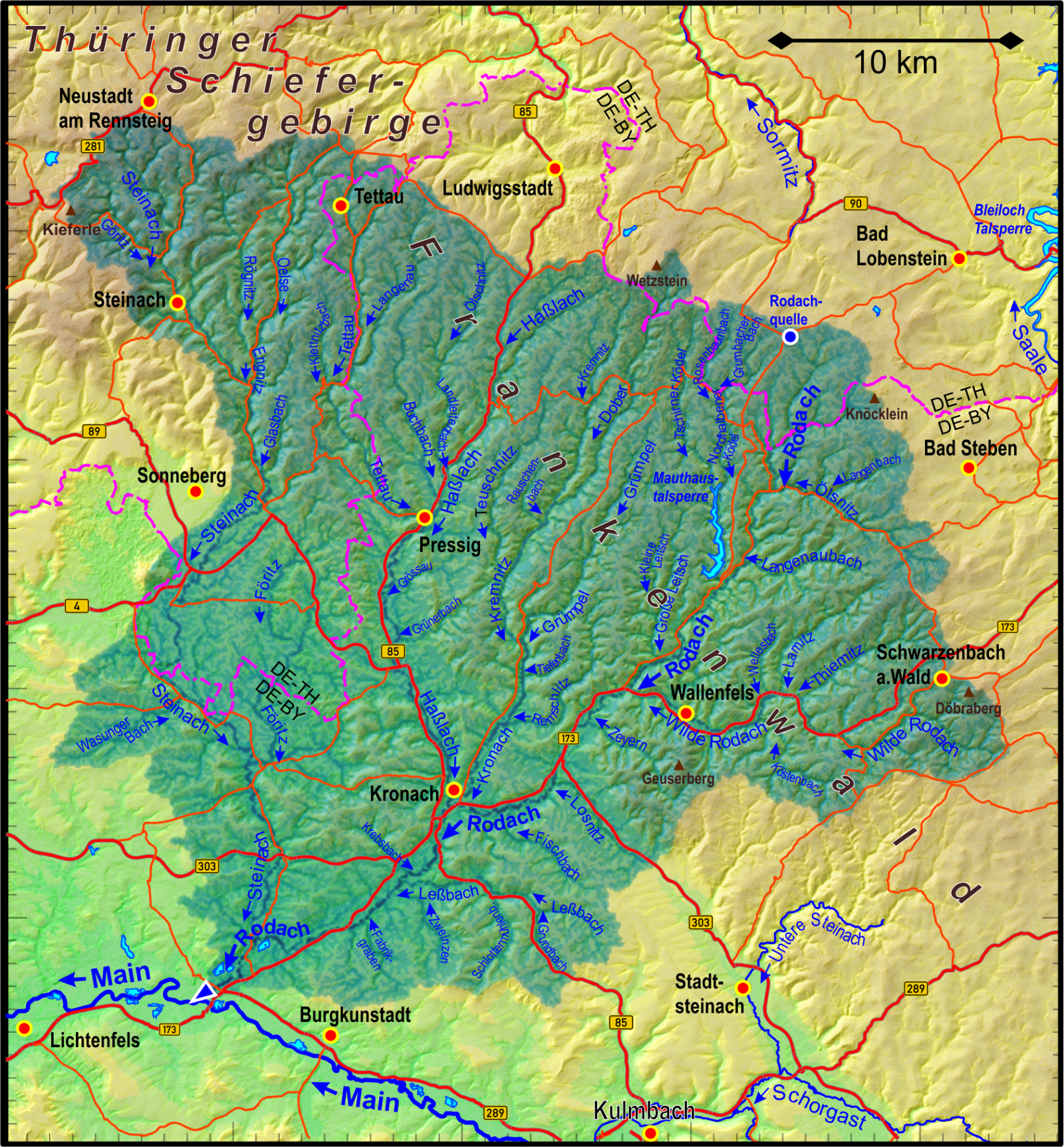
Catchment area of the Rodach

== See also ==
- List of rivers of Bavaria
