= Wilhelmsthal =

- Municipality
- Coat of arms

- Location of Wilhelmsthal within Kronach district
- Interactive map of Wilhelmsthal
- Location within Germany Location within Bavaria
- Coordinates: 50°18′31″N 11°22′16″E
- Country: Germany
- State: Bavaria
- Admin. region: Oberfranken
- District: Kronach
- Subdivisions: 8 Ortsteile

Government
  - Mayor (2020–26): Susanne Grebner

Area
  - Total: 42.92 km^{2} (16.57 sq mi)
- Elevation: 450 m (1,480 ft)

Population (2025-12-31)
  - Total: 3,377
  - Density: 78.68/km^{2} (203.8/sq mi)
- Time zone: UTC+01:00 (CET)
  - Summer (DST): UTC+02:00 (CEST)
- Postal codes: 96352
- Dialling codes: 09260
- Vehicle registration: KC
- Website: wilhelmsthal.de

Wilhelmsthal is a municipality in the district of Kronach in Bavaria, Germany.
