= Rodach (Main) =

River in Germany

- The Rodach in Steinwiesen

Location
- Country: Germany
- State: Bavaria

Physical characteristics
- Mouth
  - location: Main
  - coordinates: 50.1571°N 11.1533°E
- Length: 53.0 km (32.9 mi)
- Basin size: 1,010 km^{2} (390 sq mi)

Basin features
- Progression: Main→ Rhine→ North Sea
- Tributaries
  - left: Wilde Rodach
  - right: Haßlach, Steinach

Rodach (German pronunciation: [ˈʁoːdax]) picturesque river located in Bavaria, Germany. Flowing through the scenic landscapes of northern Bavaria, it serves as a right-bank tributary of the Main River, joining it near the town of Hochstadt am Main. The Rodach is fed by several significant tributaries, the largest of which are the Wilde Rodach, the Haßlach and the Steinach, each contributing to its steady flow and ecological diversity. The river plays an important role in the local geography and history, weaving through a region known for its natural beauty and cultural heritage.

== See also ==
- List of rivers of Bavaria
