= Fürth-Klinikum station =

Former railway station in Fürth, Germany

Fürth Klinikum
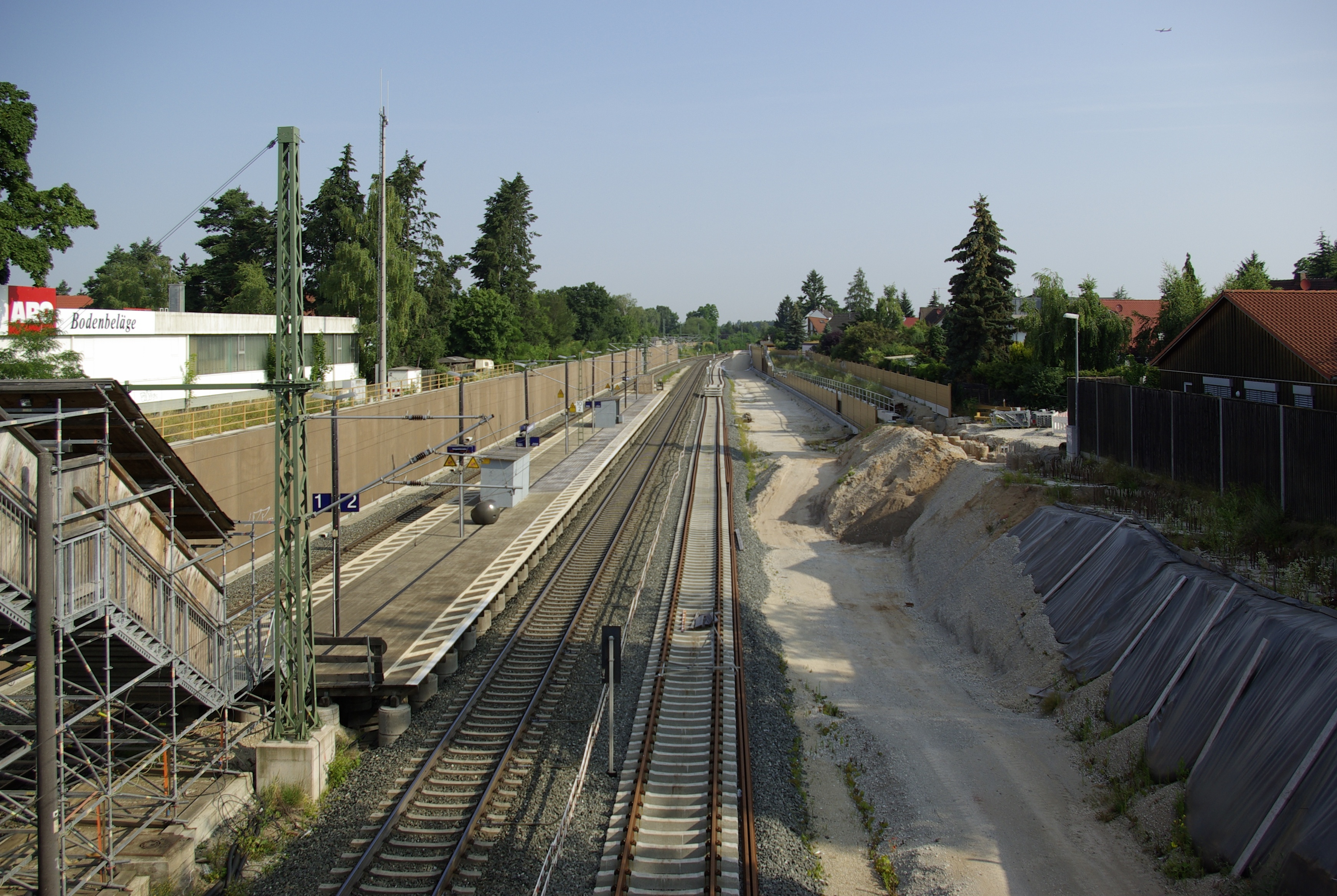
- The station in 2013

General information
- Location: Unterfarrnbacher Straße 1 Fürth, Bavaria; Germany
- Coordinates: 49°29′00″N 10°58′01″E
- Owner: DB Netz
- Operator: DB Station&Service
- Lines: Nuremberg–Bamberg line (KBS 820, 890.1)
- Distance: 10.2 km (6.3 mi) from Nürnberg Hauptbahnhof
- Platforms: 1 island platform
- Tracks: 2
- Train operators: DB Regio Bayern

Other information
- Station code: 1990
- DS100 code: NFUB
- IBNR: 8002154
- Category: 6
- Fare zone: VGN: 200
- Website: www.bahnhof.de

Services
Preceding station	Nuremberg S-Bahn	Following station
Vach towards Bamberg	S1	Fürth Hbf towards Neumarkt (Oberpfalz)
Location

Fürth-Klinikum station is a railway station in the city of Fürth, located in Bavaria, Germany. The station is on the Nuremberg–Bamberg line of Deutsche Bahn.

== Future ==
There are plans to upgrade and redesign the station for easier interchange between U1 and S1. In the course of those changes, the station is to be renamed "Klinikum" to make the link to the U-Bahn station of the same name more apparent.
