= Hallstadt (b Bamberg) station =

Railway station in Germany

Hallstadt (b Bamberg)
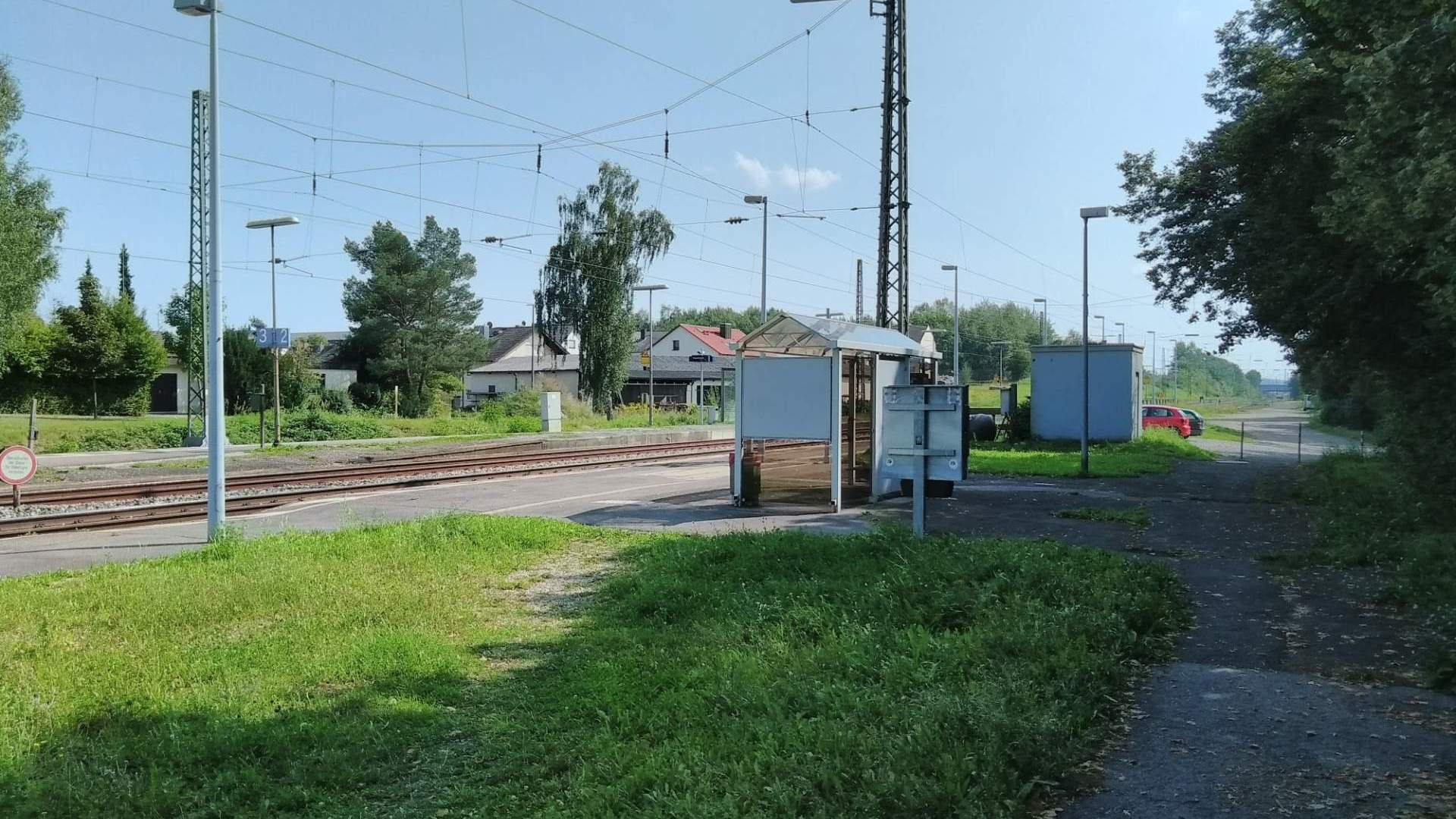
- The station in 2017

General information
- Location: Bahnhofstrasse; Hallstadt, Bavaria; Germany
- Coordinates: 49°55′45″N 10°53′08″E
- Owner: DB Netz
- Operator: DB Station&Service
- Lines: Bamberg–Hof line (KBS 820 / 850)
- Distance: 3.6 km (2.2 mi) from Bamberg
- Platforms: 1 island platform; 1 side platform
- Tracks: 3
- Train operators: agilis; DB Regio Bayern

Other information
- Station code: 2506
- DS100 code: NHAL
- IBNR: 8002542
- Category: 5
- Fare zone: 1110 (VGN)

Services
Preceding station	DB Regio Bayern	Following station
Breitengüßbach towards Kronach	RB 25	Bamberg Terminus
Preceding station		Following station
Breitengüßbach towards Lichtenfels	RB 22	Bamberg towards Ebermannstadt
Breitengüßbach towards Ebern	RB 26	Bamberg Terminus
Location

Hallstadt (b Bamberg) station (German: Bahnhof Hallstadt (b Bamberg)), is a railway station in the town of Hallstadt, in Bavaria, Germany. It is located on the Bamberg–Hof line of Deutsche Bahn.

== Services ==
As of the December 2020 timetable change,, Regionalbahn (RB) trains provide hourly or better service to Bamberg, Lichtenfels, and Ebern. These are supplemented by longer-distance Regional-Express (RE) trains throughout the day.
