= Eltersdorf station =

Railway station in Erlangen, Germany

Eltersdorf
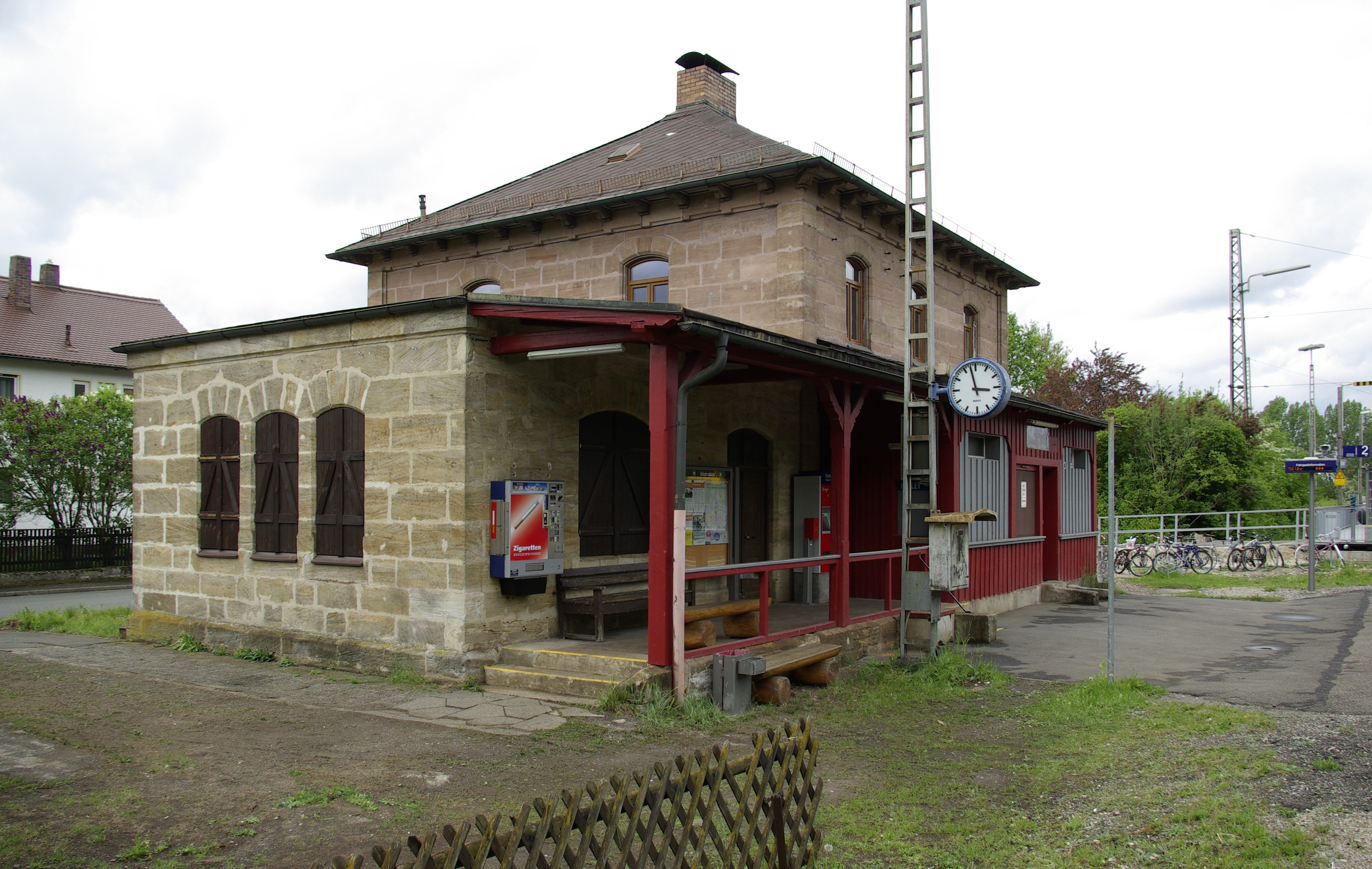
- The station building in 2012

General information
- Location: Bahnstraße 8 Erlangen, Bavaria; Germany
- Coordinates: 49°33′09″N 10°59′47″E
- Owner: DB Netz
- Operator: DB Station&Service
- Lines: Nuremberg–Bamberg line (KBS 820, 890.1)
- Distance: 18.6 km (11.6 mi) from Nürnberg Hauptbahnhof
- Platforms: 2 side platforms
- Tracks: 2
- Train operators: DB Regio Bayern

Other information
- Station code: 1571
- DS100 code: NEF
- IBNR: 8001762
- Category: 6
- Fare zone: VGN: 400
- Website: www.bahnhof.de

Services
Preceding station	Nuremberg S-Bahn	Following station
Erlangen-Bruck towards Bamberg	S1	Vach towards Neumarkt (Oberpfalz)
Location

Eltersdorf station is a railway station in Eltersdorf, a district of Erlangen in Bavaria, Germany. The station is on the Nuremberg–Bamberg line of Deutsche Bahn.
