= Nuremberg–Bamberg railway =

German railway line

Nuremberg–Bamberg Railway
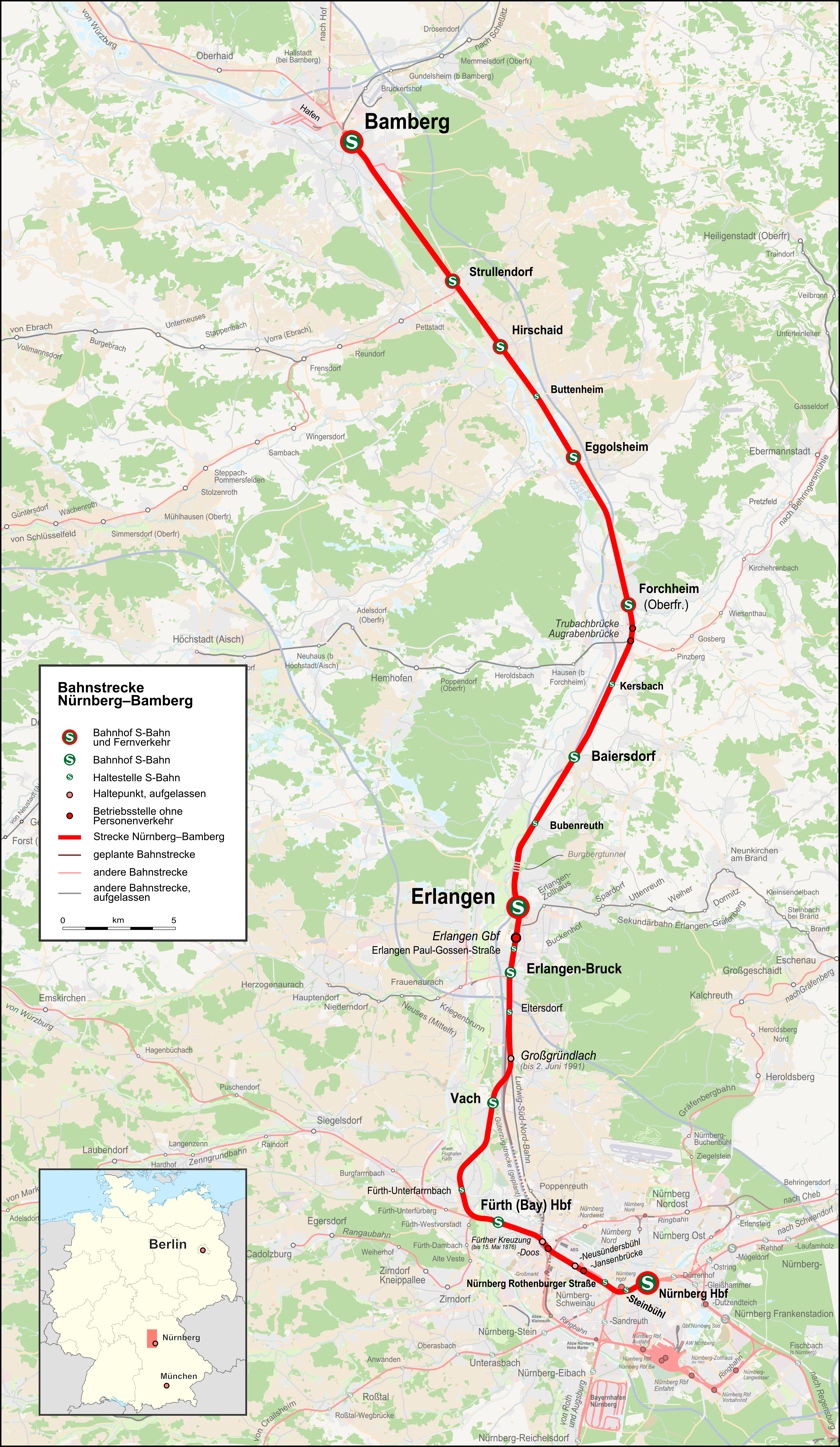

Overview
- Native name: Bahnstrecke Nürnberg–Bamberg
- Status: Operational
- Owner: DB Netz
- Line number: 5900, 5919; 5907, 5972 (Nuremberg Hbf.–Fürth)
- Locale: Bavaria, Germany
- Termini: Nürnberg Hbf; Bamberg
- Stations: 19

Service
- Type: Heavy rail, Passenger/Freight rail Intercity rail, Regional rail, Commuter rail
- Route number: 820, 890.1
- Operator(s): DB Fernverkehr, DB Regio, Nuremberg S-Bahn

History
- Opened: Stages between 1844–1876

Technical
- Line length: 62.4 km (38.8 mi)
- Number of tracks: Double track (throughout), quadruple track (between Fürth and south of Bamberg)
- Track gauge: 1,435 mm (4 ft 8 1/2 in) standard gauge
- Electrification: 15 kV/16.7 Hz AC catenary
- Operating speed: 160 km/h (99 mph)

The Nuremberg-Bamberg line is a German railway connecting the Bavarian city of Nuremberg with Bamberg via Fürth, Erlangen, Forchheim. It is part of the northern section of the Ludwig South-North Railway. It runs along the Regnitz Valley and is one of the important German transport routes. Since 2010 line S1 of the Nuremberg S-Bahn uses the entirety of the line from Nuremberg to Bamberg.

The line has become important for long-distance services since German reunification and this has increased since the opening of the Nuremberg–Erfurt high-speed line in 2017. As part of German Unity Transport Project No. 8 (Verkehrsprojekts Deutsche Einheit Nr. 8), it is being upgraded as an extension of the new line between Ebensfeld and Erfurt. It is mostly quadruple track with the exception of small sections in northern Fürth and south of Bamberg that are double track.

== History ==
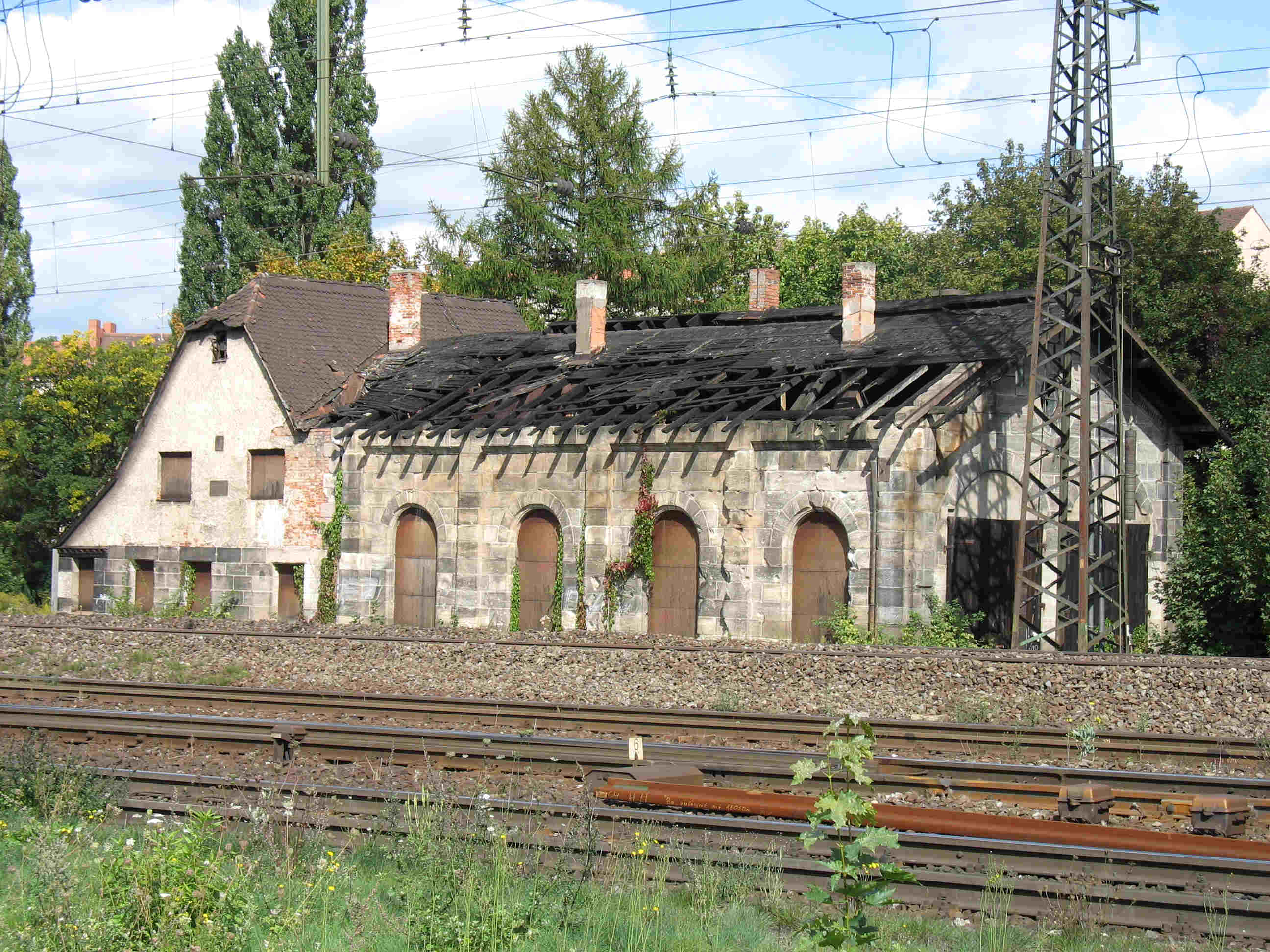
One of Germany's oldest locomotive sheds (the section on the right, built with the line to Würzburg in 1862/65) is located on the line in Fürth and closed.

After the Bavarian parliament had passed a bill for the construction of the Ludwig South–North Railway on 25 August 1843, work began on the line later in the year. The Royal Commission on Railway Construction of Nuremberg was responsible for the acquisition of land and its routing. The line was opened on 1 September 1844. The original route between Nuremberg and Erlangen, parallel to the Ludwig-Danube-Main Canal and east of Fürth was changed between 1862 and 1876 with the construction of the line to Würzburg and the so-called Furth arc. Until that time, the Ludwig South–North line the crossed the Ludwig Railway at the border of Nuremberg and Fürth.

Like all lines built in Bavaria at that time, the line was originally built as a single-track line. It was duplicated between 1862 and 1892 in four stages. Electrification of the line was completed on 10 May 1939.

During trial runs, passenger trains between Bamberg and Forchheim reached a speed of 200 km/h for the first time in Germany. These trials took place in 1963 and 1964 between Forchheim and Bamberg under automatic train control.

=== Opening dates ===
- 1 September 1844: Nuremberg–Fürth Kreuzung–Großgründlach–Bamberg
- 1 October 1862: Fürth Kreuzung–Fürth station
- 1 August 1876: Fürth station–Großgründlach

== Route ==
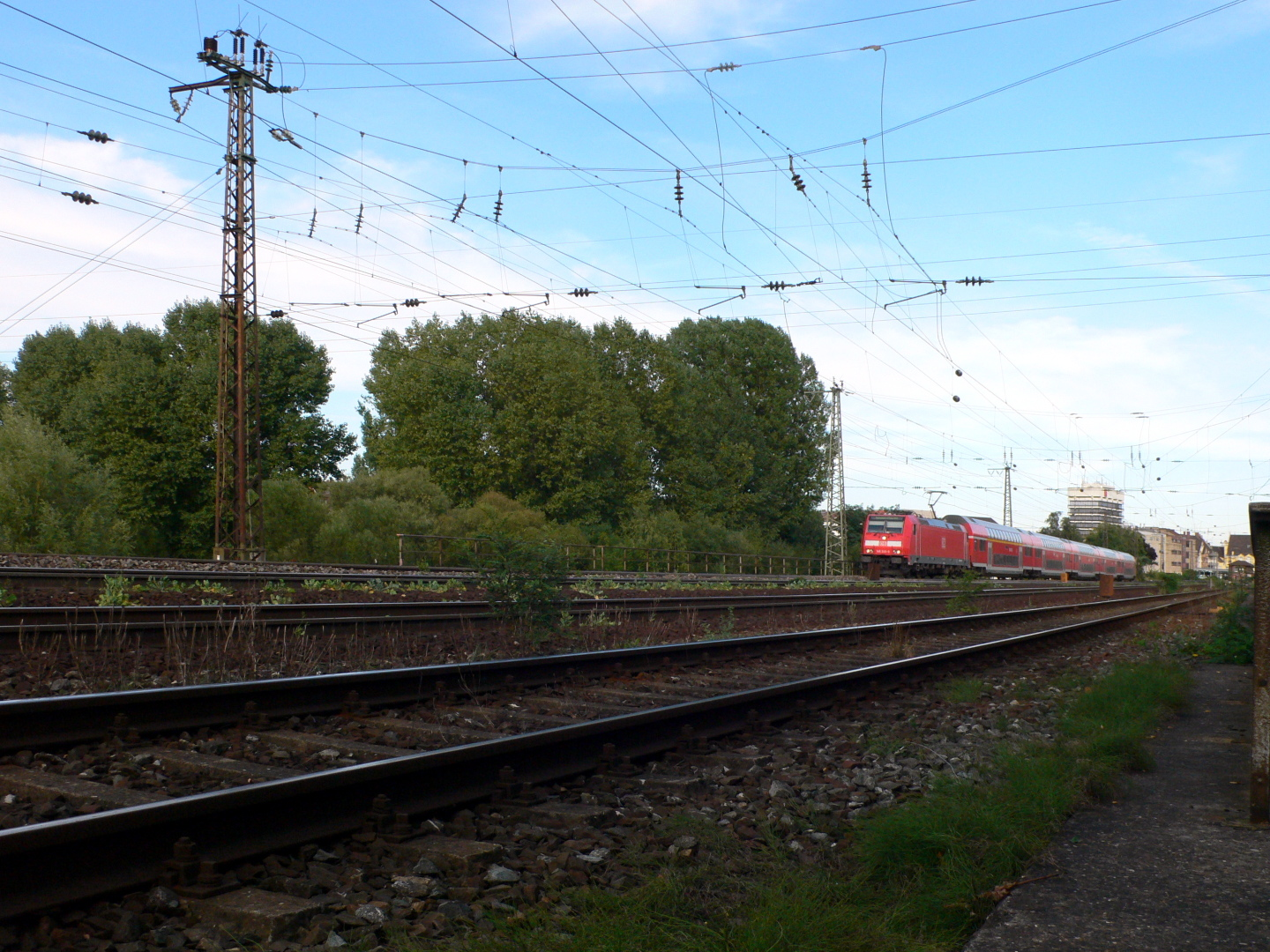
Regional-Express on the Siebenbogenbrücke in Fürth

The route leaves the Nürnberg Hauptbahnhof together with the routes to Wurzburg, to Augsburg and to Crailsheim in the west, with the latter two branching off to the south or southwest, and the line to Bamberg and Wurzburg turning to the northwest and running parallel to the Frankenschnellweg (A73. It runs south of the suburbs of Gostenhof and Eberhardshof and the container terminal and the Nuremberg West depot, through the Rothenburger Strasse station and then crosses the border between Nuremberg and Fürth and the Frankenschnellweg and finally reaches Fürth Hauptbahnhof.

After the station, the line to Wurzburg forks off to the west and the Rangau Railway to the south. The route then crosses the Rednitz river on the Siebenbogenbrücke (Seven arch bridge) and turns in a long curve to the north and crosses the river now called the Regnitz south of Stadeln. Then, the route curves to the left between Stadeln and Herboldshof to Vach station, then passes to the east side of the Frankenschnellweg and continues to Eltersdorf and Erlangen. Before the line passes through Erlangen-Bruck station there is a junction with a branch line that used to go to Herzogenaurach, notable for the manufacture of sports shoes. After Erlangen station the line passes through the 306-metre Burgberg Tunnel and continues parallel to the Frankenschnellweg through Bubenreuth, Baiersdorf and Kersbach to Forchheim. At Forchheim station, a line branches off to Ebermannstadt (connecting to a steam railway operated by Dampfbahn Fränkische Schweiz) but another branch to Höchstadt closed in 2005.

Next, the line then crosses the Frankenschnellweg again and runs between it on the right and the Rhine–Main–Danube Canal on the left through Eggolsheim, Buttenheim and Hirschaid to Strullendorf station, where the line to Schlüsselfeld branches off. After the line crosses the Bundesstraße 505 it touches the southern foothills of the Hauptsmoorer national forest before running into Bamberg station.

=== Line standards ===
The line is double-tracked and electrified along its entire length. In addition to GSM-R radio on the whole line, the section between Nuremberg Hauptbahnhof (km 0) and Bubenreuth (km 28) is equipped for active tilting technology.

=== Transport network ===
The entire Nuremberg-Bamberg route is integrated as Regionalbahn service R2 and S-Bahn service S1 of the Nuremberg S-Bahn in the transport network of Greater Nuremberg.

Long-distance passenger traffic consists of hourly Intercity-Express services on the Munich – Nuremberg – Leipzig – Berlin (– Hamburg) route. ICE T and occasional ICE 1 sets are used. One pair of ICE services each day is replaced by an Intercity service with the same travel times.

In regional transport, the line served hourly by several Regional-Express and Nuremberg S-Bahn services (as of December 2014).

Specifically, these are:

- RE Nuremberg–Bamberg–Schweinfurt–Würzburg with a second portion separating at Bamberg and continuing to Sonneberg
- RE Nuremberg–Bamberg–Lichtenfels–Coburg–Sonneberg with a second portion (uncoupled in Lichtenfels) to Jena via Kronach and Saalfeld
- RE Nuremberg–Bamberg /–Lichtenfels /–Sonneberg as individual reinforcement services on weekdays during the peak (usually operated with a set of class 442.1)
- S1 Hersbruck (left Pegnitz)/Lauf–Nuremberg–Fürth–Erlangen–Forchheim
- S1 Hartmannshof–Nuremberg–Fürth–Erlangen–Forchheim–Bamberg

The two Regional-Express services operate every two hours, together producing an hourly service. The S-Bahn offers an hourly service from Nuremberg to Bamberg and two services an hour to/from Forchheim (at alternating 20 or 40 minute intervals). All DB Regio Regionalbahn services on the line have been replaced by the S-Bahn. But since mid-2011, there have been some agilis Regionalbahn services on the section from Bamberg to Forchheim that continue to Ebermannstadt. Since the introduction of the S-Bahn, RE services no longer stop in Baiersdorf. DB regional services, except for a few peak-hour reinforcement services, are operated by Bombardier Talent 2 (class 442) sets.

The S-Bahn services on line S1 of the Nuremberg S-Bahn are also operated with Talent 2 sets. These are formed at the edges of the day and at weekends partly of single four-car sets and otherwise with two coupled sets.

Agilis is operated with Stadler Regio-Shuttle RS1 (class 650) sets.

After the calling of tenders by the Bayerische Eisenbahngesellschaft, there was a change in Regional-Express services. An hourly RE service is operated to Sonneberg Hauptbahnhof. This involves the operation of coupled Talent 2 sets that are alternately coupled or uncoupled in Bamberg or Lichtenfels. The trains that do not run to Sonneberg, run every two hours to Würzburg Hauptbahnhof or Jena Saale station and then return to Nuremberg, with the sets coupled at Bamberg or Lichtenfels. The services operate between Nürnberg and Jena/Sonneberg as the Franken-Thüringen-Express.

== Future ==
=== Upgrading to four tracks between Nuremberg and Fürth ===
A groundbreaking ceremony was held on 10 August 2006 at the Rothenburger Straße railway overpass to begin the building of two extra tracks on the 7.7 kilometre-long section between Nuremberg and Fürth to provide four tracks. This was built as part of the Nuremberg–Erfurt high-speed railway project and the 38 kilometre-long Nuremberg S-Bahn line to Forchheim. Funding of €170 million was allocated for the section. Commissioning was originally due to take place in December 2010. In February 2008, the planned costs were stated to be €162 million.

Construction began in March 2008 to widen the embankment for 1.75 km between Nuremberg and Fürth so that two additional tracks could be built south of the existing line. A total of 22.3 kilometres of track and eight bridges were reconstructed or replaced. New platform were built at Hauptbahnhof Fürth and Nürnberg-Steinbühl station and Nürnberg Rothenburger Str. station was adapted for the S-Bahn. The western end of Nuremberg station and the eastern end of the Fürth freight yard were also rebuilt.

An electronic interlocking was installed at Furth station. Its first construction phase went into operations on 14 September 2009. Since December 2011, the interlocking has partially controlled Fürth station and completely controls the section between Nuremberg and Fürth with a total of 87 main signals and 94 axle counters.

A third track has been available between Nuremberg and Fürth for the S-Bahn since 18 December 2010. All four tracks have been in use since 21 November 2011. The northernmost track is used by the S-Bahn in both directions, one track is used for regional traffic and two tracks are used for long-distance traffic. Subsequently, the S-Bahn platform at Fürth Hauptbahnhof was also finished. The S-Bahn halt of Nürnberg-Steinbühl was not then operational, but it was completed in late 2012.

=== Nuremberg–Forchheim S-Bahn extension ===
The whole line from Nuremberg to Bamberg is being upgraded to four tracks. Construction work on the "Furth arc" (Fürther Bogen) near Hauptbahnhof Fürth began in 2008. The line is under construction between Fürth Hbf and the bridge over the Regnitz in Fürth. Two new tracks are being laid for the S-Bahn. For this purpose, another bridge had to be built next to the Siebenbogen (seven arch) Bridge in Fürth. During this work the course of the original tracks was moved to the west. This was completed by the end of 2010. The construction of the S-Bahn tracks has begun in this area, but has remained unfinished with hardly any construction activity going on after 2012 (as of April 2014). After the planned completion of the work in December 2016, the halt of Fürth-Unterfarrnbach was to be renamed Fürth-Klinikum. No further work has been done north of this section of the line as far as the municipal boundary of Erlangen.

The route was disputed between the city of Fürth and Deutsche Bahn, but the Federal Railway Authority (Eisenbahn-Bundesamt) approved the plan on 30 January 2014. The city of Fürth appealed to the Federal Administrative Court against this planning approval in April 2014. According to the Bavarian Ministry of Transport in December 2010, the planned new S-Bahn route, which would run via Schmalau (the so-called Fürther Verschwenk, Fürth pivot), would have a benefit-cost ratio of 1.18. By contrast, the two routes along the existing line favoured by the city of Fürth are not economically viable and thus ineligible for funding. The Federal Administrative Court announced on 16 October 2014 an urgent application by the city of Fürth, an environmental association and several private property owners against the immediate enforceability of the planning approval on this section of the S-Bahn for the line to be built through the districts of Steinach (city of Fürth) and Schmalau (city of Nuremberg) away from and to the east of the existing line. The Federal Administrative Court ordered a suspension of work, because the interest of considering the legal objections of the applicants and the public interest outweighed the interest of DB Netz AG in the immediate completion of the plan as approved. In the middle of 2016, a decision of the Federal Administrative Court was expected to be delivered in the autumn of 2016. DB announced in 2017 that a positive decision of the court would allow the construction of the line by 2021. The Federal Administrative Court in Leipzig declared the S-Bahn pivot to the north of Fürth to be unlawful and not enforceable on 9 November 2017.

On 8 April 2015, the state and DB signed a planning agreement to connect the three-kilometre section temporally with points from 2019. Their installation and upgrade is expected to cost €2 million each. The planning agreement is partly a financial agreement. The commissioning of the work is not possible until 2019 at the earliest and the estimated cost of the points, including their later dismantling, would be €10.4 million instead of the previously estimated €2.6 million.

Work began in 2011 on the upgrading of the line in the urban area of Erlangen and to the north of Baiersdorf. The Paul-Gossen-Straße S-Bahn halt in Erlangen was opened in December 2015 and one year later the Unterfarrnbach/Fürth Klinikum station followed. The upgrade between Eltersdorf and Erlangen was to be completed along with the Fürth arc, including the Stadeln and Steinach stations, by the end of 2016. At the end of 2017, the upgrade between Erlangen and Baiersdorf was to be completed by the end of 2018. This would allow the operation of services at 20-minute intervals in peak hour. The upgrade of the Bamberg junction would not start before 2020 according to a presentation of DB Netz (as of mid 2014). A report commissioned by the town of Bamberg questioned Deutsche Bahn upgrade plans. Freight traffic could be handled on the existing tracks in 2030. The next section to Bamberg would be completed by 2024 and the completion of work in Bamberg is conceivable at the earliest in 2028 (as of 2017).

The establishment of a halt at Forchheim Nord is being considered. A planning agreement was concluded in January 2016. The halt would be built as long as no cost increase occurs.

The design speed for S-Bahn services is 140 km/h.

=== Nuremberg–Ebensfeld upgraded line ===
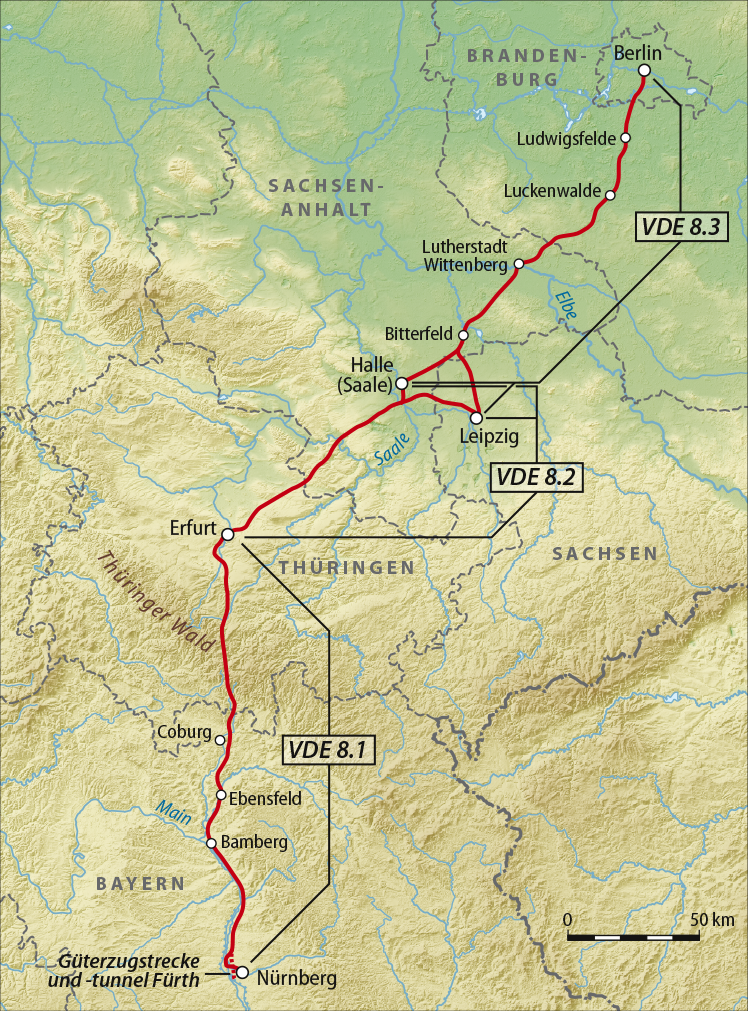
The upgraded section forms the southern section of subproject VDE 8.1

The line between Nuremberg and Ebensfeld is being upgraded for speeds up to 230 km/h, further reducing the travel time from Munich to Berlin, which has been significantly reduced by the construction of the Nuremberg–Ingolstadt high-speed railway. To relieve Fürth junction, where the freight traffic of the Nuremberg marshalling yard–Fürth–Bamberg route crosses the passenger routes between Nuremberg and Bamberg and Nuremberg and Würzburg, funding of €20 million has been provided for the modernisation and electrification of the connection between the marshalling yard and the main goods yard. Furthermore, an approximately 13 kilometre-long freight bypass line will be built in a tunnel below the Nuremberg and Fürth urban area by 2021.

During a blockade of the Bamberg–Forchheim section from 1 August to 14 September 2009, the stations of Buttenheim and Strullendorf were rebuilt for the S-Bahn and connected to the new tracks between Nuremberg and Fürth.
