= Vach station =

Railway station in Fürth, Germany

Vach
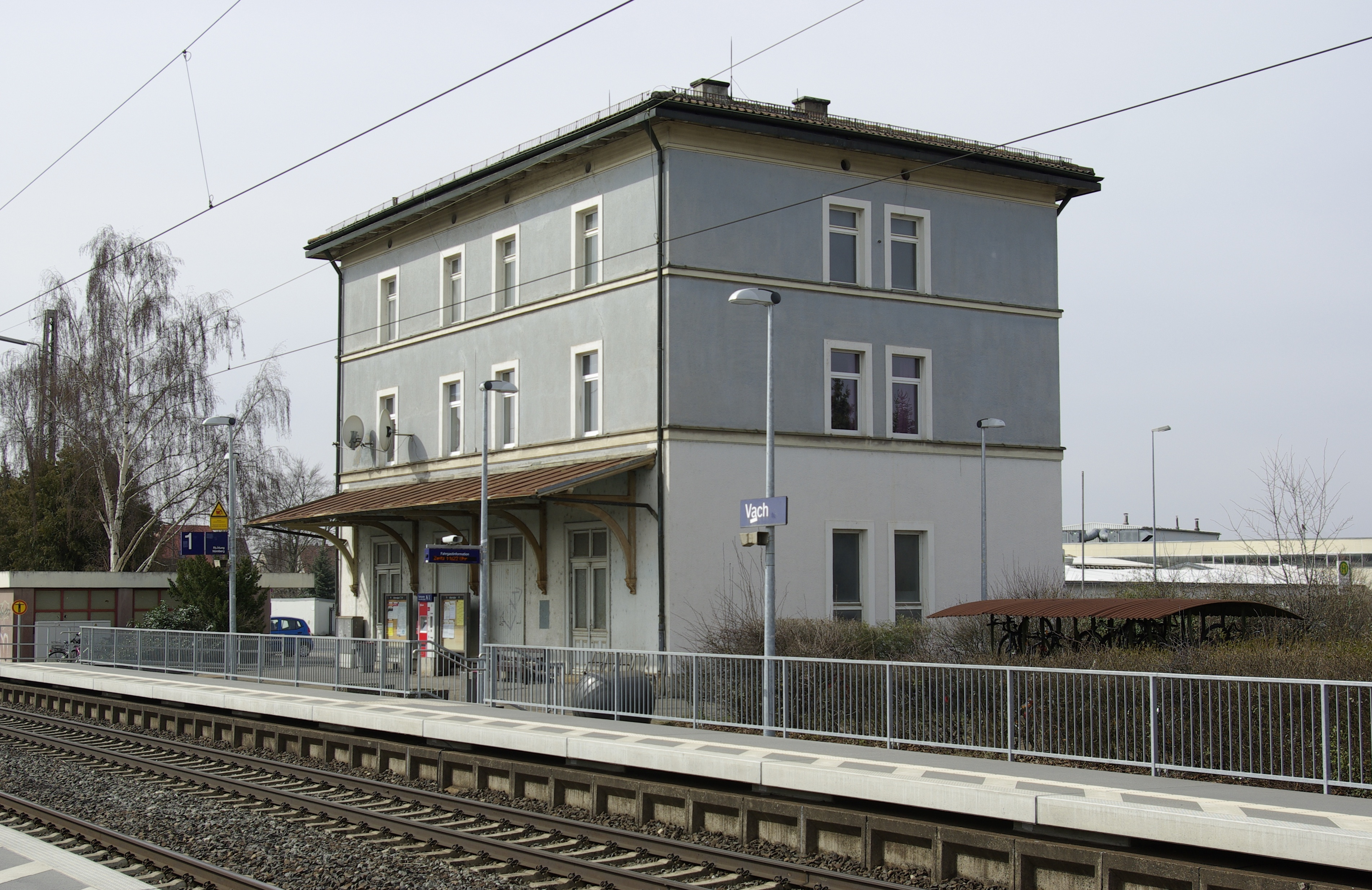
- The station in 2013

General information
- Location: Herboldshofer Straße 60; Vach, Bavaria; Germany
- Coordinates: 49°31′03″N 10°59′10″E
- Owner: DB Netz
- Operator: DB Station&Service
- Lines: Nuremberg–Bamberg line (KBS 820, 890.1)
- Distance: 14.5 km (9.0 mi) from Nürnberg Hauptbahnhof
- Platforms: 1 island platform; 1 side platform
- Tracks: 3
- Train operators: DB Regio Bayern

Other information
- Station code: 6385
- DS100 code: NVA
- IBNR: 8006052
- Category: 5
- Fare zone: VGN: 200 and 397
- Website: www.bahnhof.de

Services
Preceding station	Nuremberg S-Bahn	Following station
Eltersdorf towards Bamberg	S1	Fürth-Unterfarrnbach towards Neumarkt (Oberpfalz)
Location

Vach station is a railway station in the city of Fürth, located in Bavaria, Germany. The station is on the Nuremberg–Bamberg line of Deutsche Bahn.
