= Bamberg–Scheßlitz railway =

Railway in Germany

Overview
- Line number: 5114

Technical
- Line length: 13,8 km
- Track gauge: 1,435 mm (4 ft 8 1/2 in)

The Bamberg–Scheßlitz line, colloquially known as the Schääzer Bockerla (Upper Franconian for Scheßlitzer Böcklein or Little Schesslitz Goat) refers to a 14 kilometre-long branch line from Bamberg to Scheßlitz in the province of Upper Franconia, in Bavaria, southern Germany. Route number: 5114

== History ==
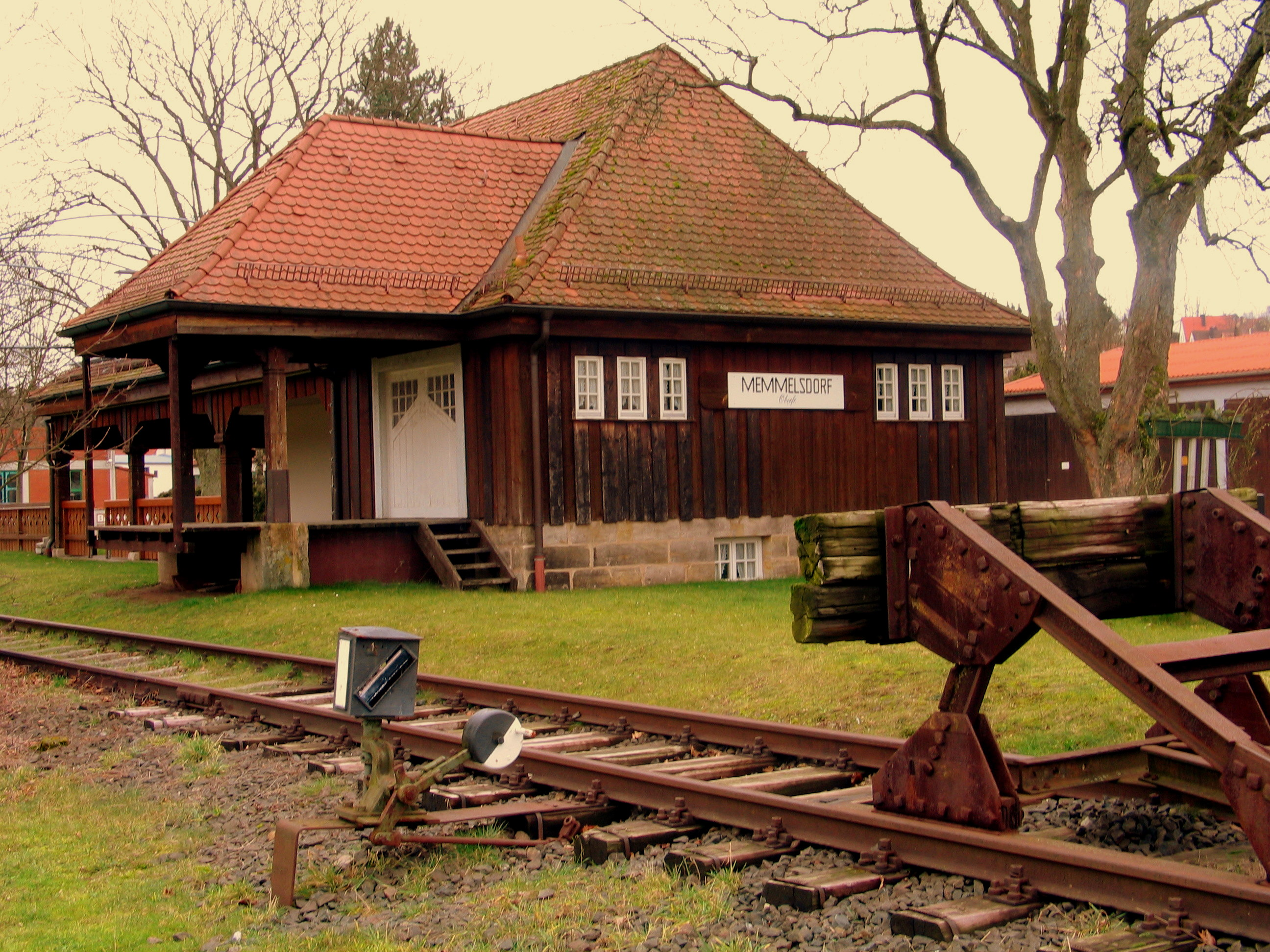
Former station at Memmelsdorf

The line first opened in 1908. Its passenger services ended on 31 May 1985, and freight traffic on 27 May 1988. The tracks were lifted in the winter of that year as far as Bruckertshof. Between Bamberg and Memmelsdorf the railway embankment has been built on by the A 70/A 73 motorways, but is still largely visible due to the ballast bed that has not been entirely removed. On the trackbed between Memmelsdorf and Scheßlitz a cycle path has been laid. The only remaining station buildings (Memmelsdorf, Scheßlitz) have been used for other purposes. The station building at Memmelsdorf was restored and converted for 180,000 DM, and now houses the local choral society. The station building at Scheßlitz is a store for the Scheßlitz Local History Society.

A planned railway line between Scheßlitz and Hollfeld, terminus of the Bayreuth–Hollfeld railway, was shelved again in 1906 after a lot of preparatory work, because the two towns let the project fail. The reasons were not the high construction costs (about 2 million marks), but because both towns wanted to have the lucrative status of a terminus.

The land in between was to have been used for trading estates. When the district council for the royal Bavarian district of Scheßlitz authorised a subsidy of 70,000 marks for the construction of a line from Scheßlitz to Hollfeld, the town of Scheßlitz demanded that its subsidy of 50,000 marks for the construction of the Bamberg-Scheßlitz route had to be given back if a line to Hollfeld were built.

== See also ==
- Royal Bavarian State Railways
- Bavarian branch lines
- List of closed railway lines in Bavaria

== Sources ==
- Matthias Wolf: "Das Schäätzer Bockäla". Schweinfurt: Verlag Wolfgang Bleiweis, 1992. ISBN 3-928786-13-X
- Bamberger Eisenbahnfreunde e. V. (Hg.) Red.: Oliver Kaschel: "Erinnerung an eine Nebenbahn : Bamberg–Scheßlitz". 3., überarb. Aufl. – Bamberg : Bamberger Eisenbahnfreunde, 1992. – 46 S. : Ill., Kt.
