= Blankenstein (Saale) station =

Railway halt in Blankenstein, Germany

Blankenstein (Saale)
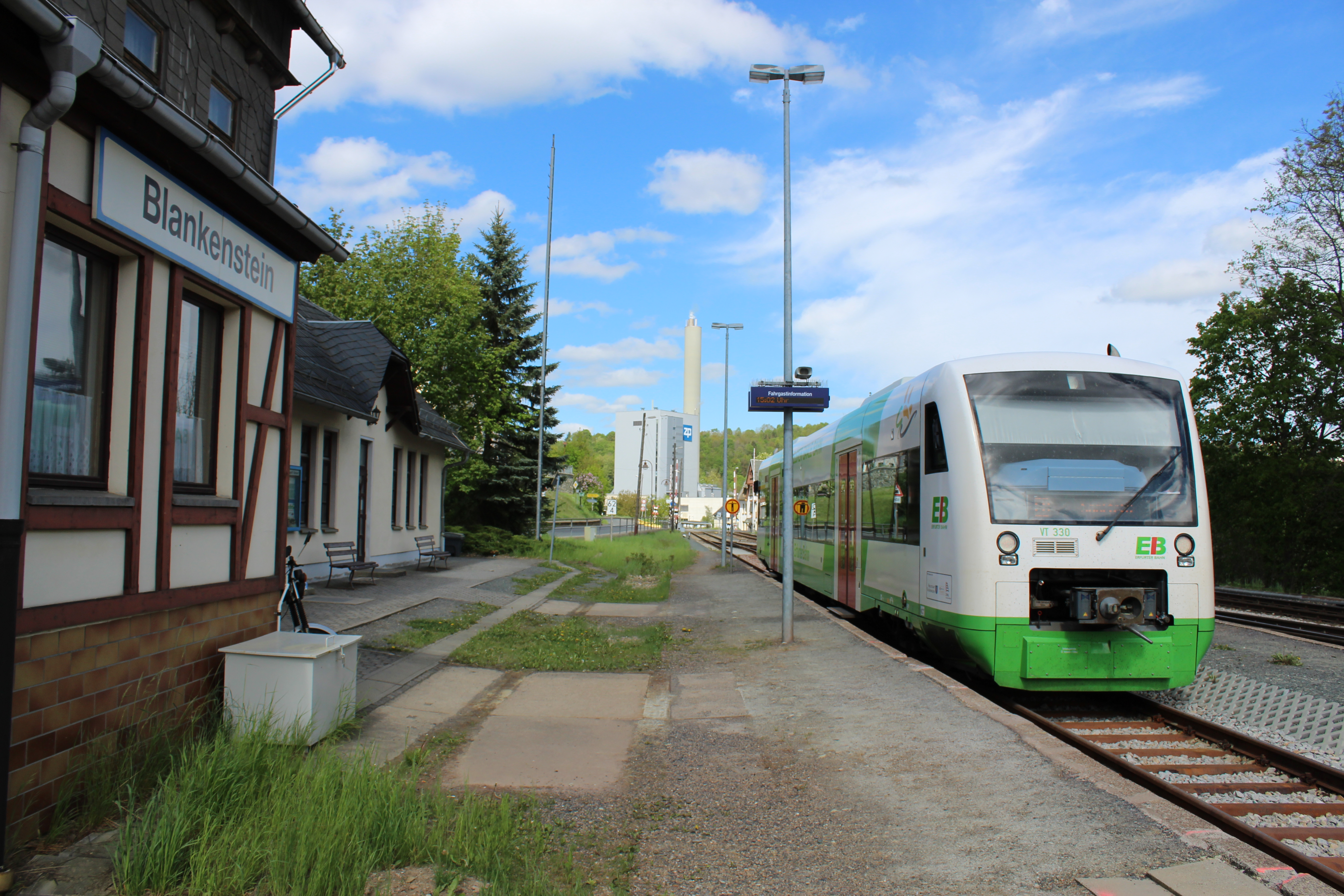
- 2018

General information
- Location: Absangerstraße 1; 07366 Blankenstein; Thuringia; Germany
- Coordinates: 50.4012°N 11.6980°E
- Elevation: 435 m (1,427 ft)
- System: Bf
- Owner: Deutsche Bahn
- Operator: DB Station&Service
- Lines: Triptis–Marxgrün railway (KBS 557)
- Platforms: 2 side platforms
- Tracks: 2
- Train operators: Erfurter Bahn

Other information
- Station code: 694
- DS100 code: UBN
- IBNR: 8011206
- Category: 6
- Website: www.bahnhof.de

Services
Preceding station		Following station
Harra towards Saalfeld (Saale)	RB 32	Terminus
Location
- Location within Thuringia

Blankenstein (Saale) station is a railway station in the municipality of Blankenstein, located in the Saale-Orla-Kreis district in Thuringia, Germany.
