= Schney station =

Railway station in Germany

Schney

General information
- Location: Am Bahnhof; Lichtenfels, Bavaria; Germany
- Coordinates: 50°09′59″N 11°04′25″E
- Owner: DB Netz
- Operator: DB Station&Service
- Line: Eisenach–Lichtenfels line
- Distance: 148.3 km (92.1 mi) from Eisenach
- Platforms: 1 side platform
- Tracks: 1
- Train operators: agilis; DB Regio Bayern

Other information
- Station code: 5630
- DS100 code: NSY
- IBNR: 8005391
- Category: 6
- Fare zone: VGN: 1301
- Website: www.bahnhof.de

History
- Opened: 1894

Services
| Preceding station | | Following station |
|---|---|---|
| Ebersdorf (b Coburg) towards Coburg | RB 24 | Lichtenfels towards Bayreuth Hbf |
Location

Schney station is a railway station in the Schney district of the town of Lichtenfels, located in the Lichtenfels district in Upper Franconia, Germany. The station is on the Eisenach–Lichtenfels line of Deutsche Bahn.
