= Haßfurt station =

Railway station in Lower Franconia, Germany

Haßfurt
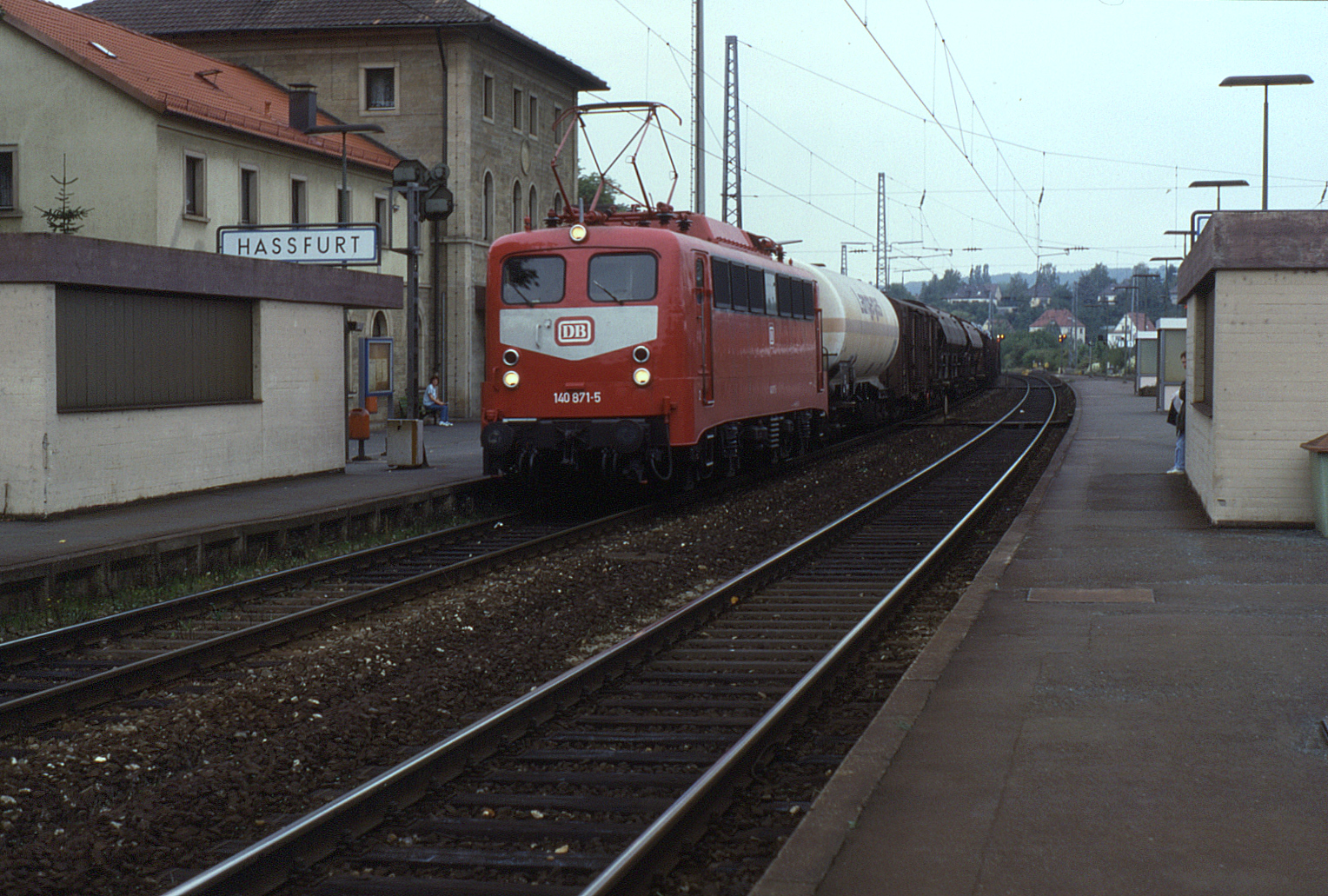
- 1991

General information
- Location: Bahnhofstraße 12; 97437 Haßfurt; Bavaria; Germany
- Coordinates: 50°02′00″N 10°30′36″E
- System: Bf
- Owner: Deutsche Bahn
- Operator: DB Station&Service
- Lines: Bamberg–Rottendorf railway (KBS 810); Haßfurt–Hofheim railway (KBS 816)
- Platforms: 1 island platform 1 side platform
- Tracks: 3
- Train operators: DB Regio Franken; DB Regio Mitte

Other information
- Station code: 2582
- DS100 code: NHT
- IBNR: 8002630
- Category: 4
- Fare zone: VGN: 1011
- Website: www.bahnhof.de

Services
Preceding station	DB Regio Bayern	Following station
Schweinfurt Hbf towards Würzburg Hbf	RE 20	Bamberg towards Nürnberg Hbf
Schweinfurt Hbf towards Frankfurt (Main) Hbf	RE 54	Bamberg Terminus
Schweinfurt Hbf towards Frankfurt (Main) Hbf	RE 55 Sa+Su	Bamberg Terminus
Schonungen towards Schlüchtern	RB 53	Zeil towards Bamberg
Location
- Location within Bavaria Location within Germany Location within Europe

Haßfurt station is a railway station in the municipality of Haßfurt, located in the Haßberge district in Bavaria, Germany.
