= Vach =

Coordinates: 49°31′34″N 10°57′55″E

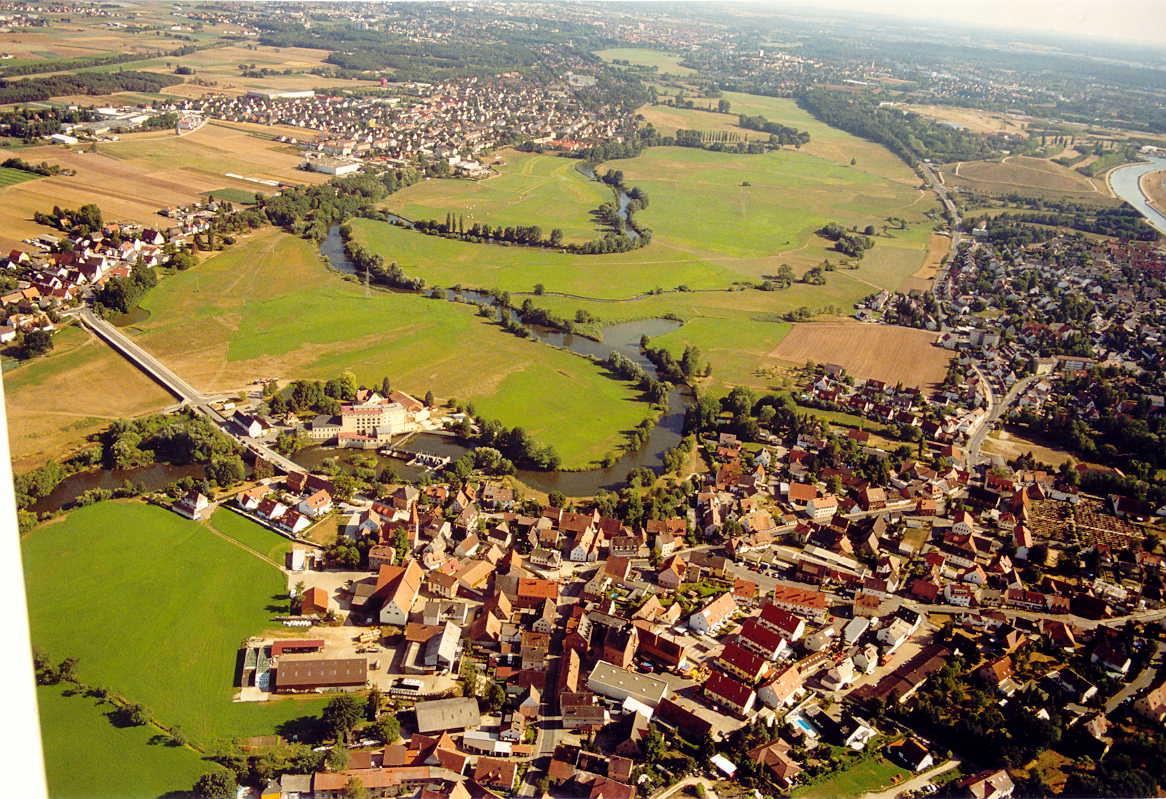
Aerial view

Vach is a district in the city of Fürth, Germany. Originally a separate town, it was incorporated into Fürth in 1972. It is first mentioned in documents concerning Gundekar II of Eichstätt in 1059. As of 1961, Vach has an area of 8.208 km².

The village is located between the Rhine–Main–Danube Canal and the Regnitz, into which the Zenn and, further north, the Michaelbach flows. The flood plain of Regnitz and Zenn is listed as a landscape conservation area. The village has a population of 2815 and 712 inhabited houses as of 1987.

== Transportation ==
The station "Vach Bahnhof" is a regular stop on the railway line between Fürth and Erlangen, but it is located approx.2km away from the district Vach in the district of Stadeln. Vach is also reachable by the motorway A73; from the north by the slip road "Eltersdorf" and from the south by the slip road "Ronhof".

== Sights ==
The church, rectory and the "Kantorat" form an attractive ensemble of monuments. The church with its western tower and its drawn-in choir with a wind-tower per eastern corner date from the Gothic Age. The nave and choir were probably built in 1442, when Vach was promoted to a parish. The western tower with three floors was added shortly afterwards.

A special feature is the Ginkgo in the garden of the rectory, which is not open to the public.

== Sports ==
The sports club TV Vach 1903 has approximately 530 members as of 2020.
