= Ebermannstadt station =

Railway station in Germany

Ebermannstadt
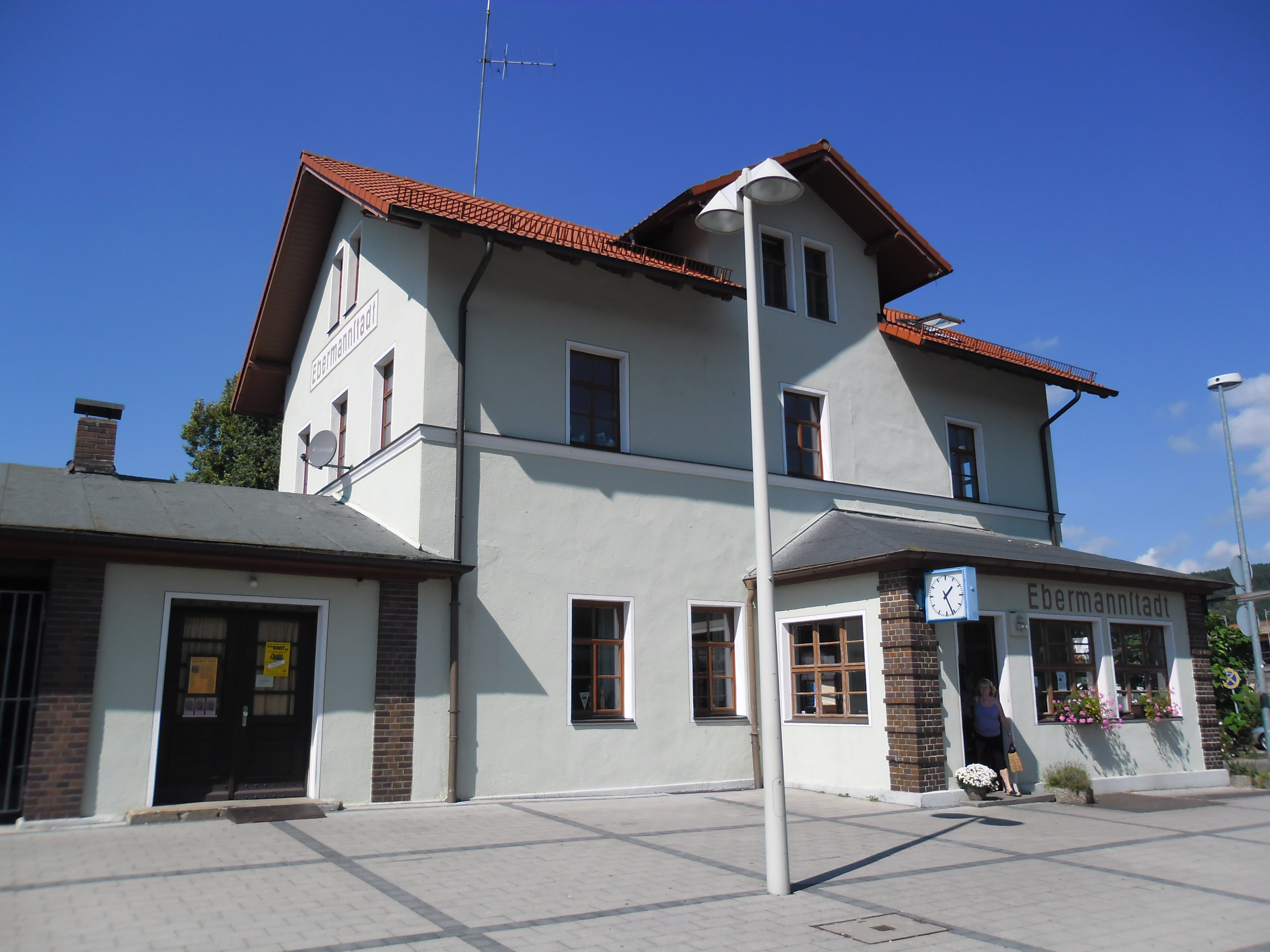
- 2011

General information
- Location: Bahnhofplatz 1; 91320 Ebermannstadt; Bavaria; Germany
- Coordinates: 49.7768°N 11.1866°E
- Elevation: 291 m (955 ft)
- System: Bf
- Owner: Deutsche Bahn
- Operator: DB Station&Service
- Line: Forchheim–Behringersmühle railway
- Platforms: 1 island platform 1 side platform
- Tracks: 3
- Train operators: Agilis
- Connections: RB

Other information
- Station code: 1433
- DS100 code: NEBM
- IBNR: 8001627
- Category: 6
- Fare zone: VGN: 371
- Website: www.bahnhof.de

History
- Opened: 1 June 1892; 134 years ago

Services
Preceding station		Following station
Pretzfeld towards Lichtenfels	RB 22	Terminus
Location
- Location within Bavaria Location within Germany Location within Europe

Ebermannstadt station is a railway station in the town of Ebermannstadt, located in the Forchheim district in Upper Franconia, Germany.
