= Saalfeld (Saale) station =

Railway halt in Saalfeld, Germany

Saalfeld (Saale)
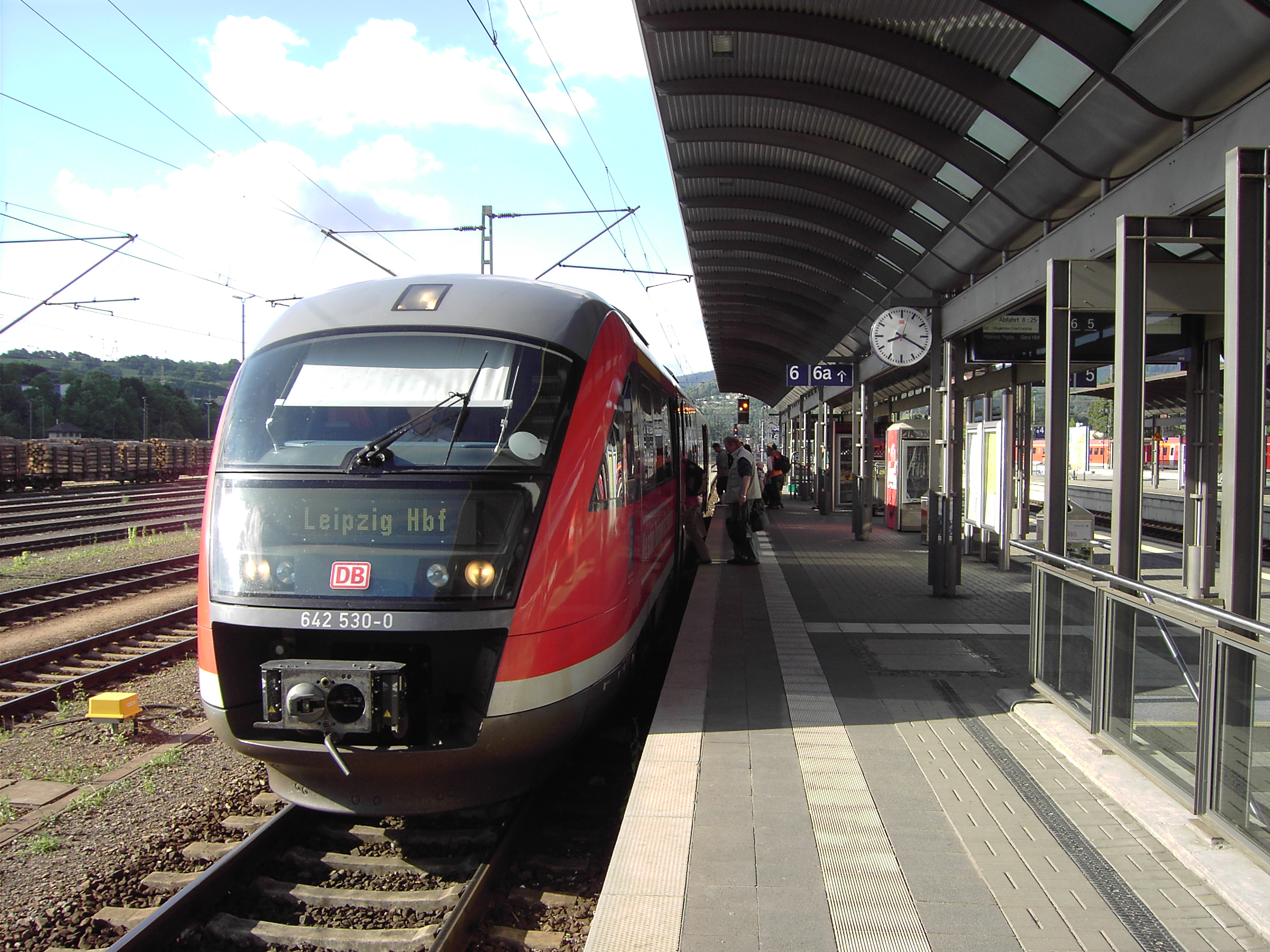
- Class 642 diesel multiple unit in Saalfeld station on its way to Leipzig

General information
- Location: Kulmbacher Str. 25, Saalfeld/Saale, Thuringia; Germany
- Coordinates: 50°39′3″N 11°22′29″E
- Owner: Deutsche Bahn
- Operator: DB Netz; DB Station&Service
- Lines: Naumburg–Saalfeld; Saalfeld–Bamberg; Leipzig–Gera–Saalfeld; Arnstadt–Saalfeld; Saalfeld–Blankenstein
- Platforms: 6

Construction
- Accessible: Yes

Other information
- Station code: 5450
- DS100 code: US
- IBNR: 8010309
- Category: 3
- Website: www.bahnhof.de

History
- Opened: 20 December 1871; 154 years ago
- Electrified: 1939–1946; 28 May 1995; 31 years ago
Services
Preceding station	DB Fernverkehr	Following station
Jena-Göschwitz towards Berlin Gesundbrunnen	ICE 18	Lichtenfels towards München Hbf
Kronach towards Karlsruhe Hbf	IC 61	Rudolstadt (Thür) towards Leipzig Hbf
Preceding station	Abellio Rail Mitteldeutschland	Following station
Terminus	RE 15	Rudolstadt-Schwarza towards Leipzig Hbf
Terminus	RB 25	Rudolstadt-Schwarza towards Halle (Saale) Hbf
Preceding station		Following station
Terminus	RE 12	Pößneck ob Bf towards Leipzig Hbf
Terminus	RB 22	Unterwellenborn towards Leipzig Hbf
Terminus	RB 23	Bad Blankenburg (Thüringerw) towards Erfurt Hbf
Breternitz towards Blankenstein (Saale)	RB 32	Terminus
Preceding station	DB Regio Bayern	Following station
Terminus	RE 14	Breternitz towards Nürnberg Hbf
Location

Saalfeld station (called Saalfeld (Saale) or Saalfeld (S) by Deutsche Bahn) is the station in the city of Saalfeld in the southeast of the German state of Thuringia. It is classified by Deutsche Bahn as a category 3 station.

== History ==
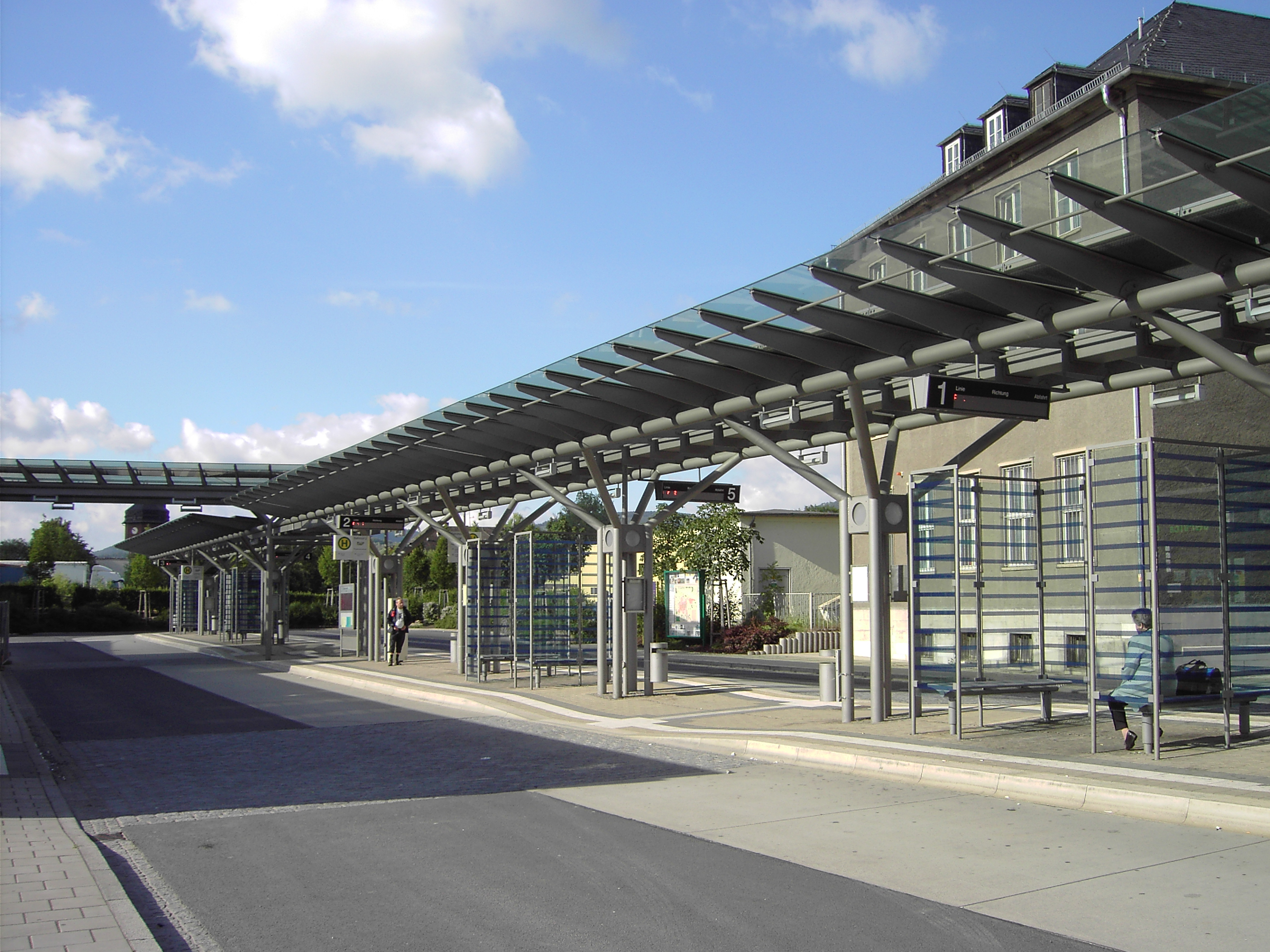
Bus station in front of the entrance building

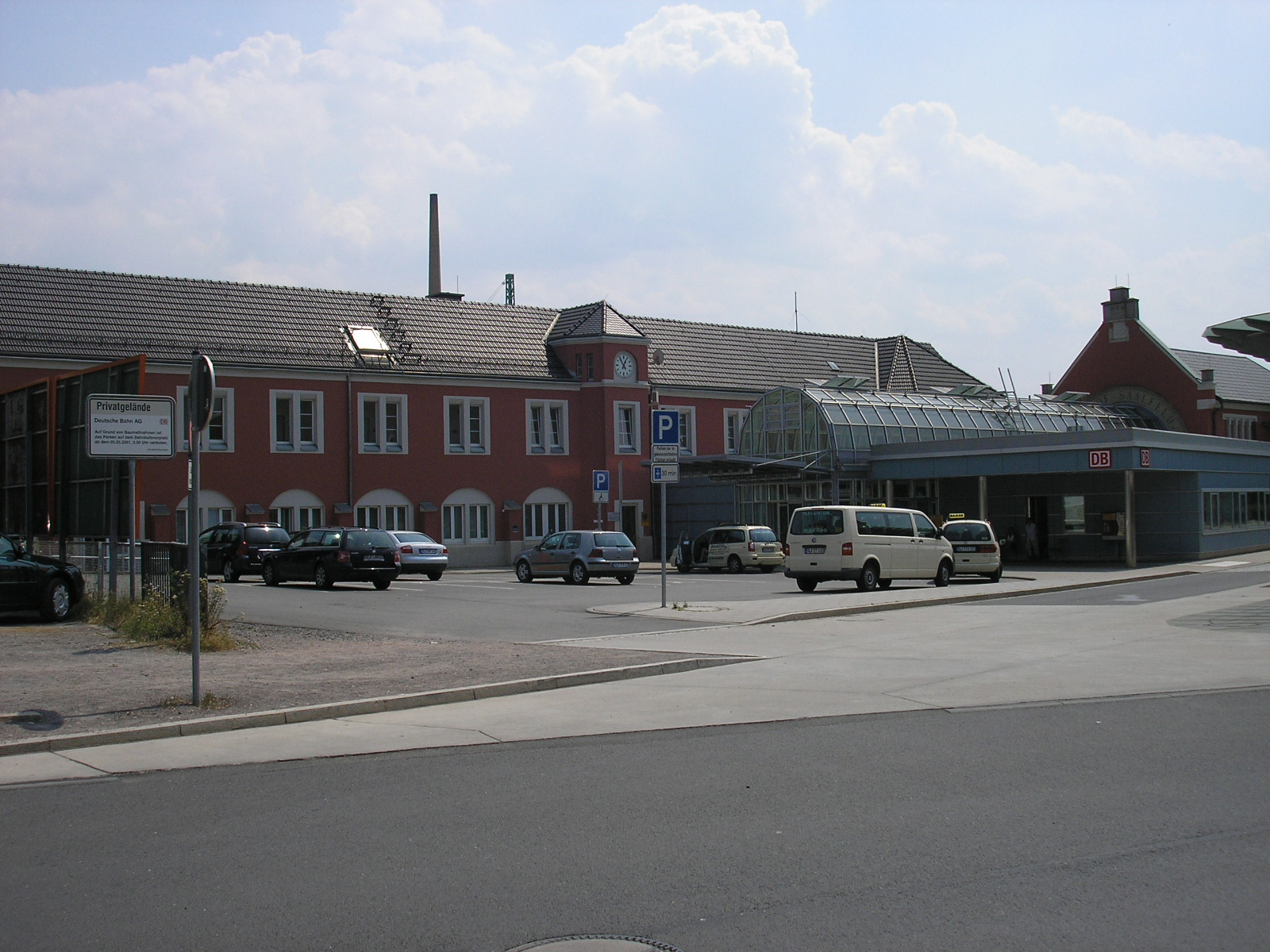
Station building

The railway reached Saalfeld on 20 December 1871 with the opening of the Gera–Saalfeld line from the northeast. The station was also built at that time. It was from the outset planned as a railway junction and was built on land that was then undeveloped to the east of Saalfeld, opposite the old town, with a large area set aside for operations. In 1874 the Saal Railway was opened from Naumburg via Jena to Saalfeld, giving the city a further rail connection to the northeast. The Franconian Forest Railway was opened via the Rennsteig to Lichtenfels in 1885. This was the second line from Berlin to Munich after the Saxon-Bavarian Railway and was, in fact, a faster route. After it was finished the importance of Saalfeld station grew sharply. It was the last major station before a climb of almost 400 metres through the Franconian Forest.

Other lines were opened to Saalfeld: the Arnstadt–Saalfeld line from Erfurt in 1895, the Schwarza Valley Railway from Katzhütte and the Köditzberg–Königsee line from Königsee in 1900, the line from Hof 1907 and the Sonneberg–Probstzella railway from Sonnenberg in 1913. During the Second World War, the strategically important station was destroyed in air strikes. The division of Germany reduced its importance, since traffic between East Germany and Bavaria was reduced. However, Interzone trains crossed at Saalfeld, as the Franconian Forest Railway, along with the more easterly line via Hof, were the only rail links between East Germany and Bavaria. The second track was dismantled in 1946 between Saaleck junction near Naumburg and Probstzella as reparations to the Soviet Union.

After German reunification, the importance of the station was restored. In 1994/95 the Saal Railway and Franconian Forest Railway were electrified and the second track were restored. For 17 years from 2000, it was the only direct ICE route between Berlin and Munich, while the importance of the second line via Hof has declined. In the following years, the station was upgraded to support modern long-distance traffic and received, among other things, three new and fully accessible platforms. The entrance building was renovated and extended.

The completion of the Nuremberg–Erfurt high-speed line in 2017 lead to Saalfeld—along with Jena and the Bavarian station of Lichtenfels—losing their ICE stops to Erfurt.

The marshalling yard to the east of the passenger station is closed.

== Operations ==
The following services stop at the station (2026):

Line	Route	Interval (minutes)	Operator
ICE 18	Berlin Gesundbrunnen – Berlin – Leipzig – Saalfeld – Nuremberg – Augsburg – Munich	One train pair	DB Fernverkehr
IC 61	Leipzig – Naumburg – Saalfeld (Saale) – Lichtenfels – Bamberg – Nuremberg – Stuttgart – Pforzheim – Karlsruhe	2 train pairs	DB Fernverkehr
RE 12	Saalfeld – Pößneck ob Bf – Weida – Gera – Zeitz – Leipzig	120^{*}	Erfurter Bahn
RE 14	Nuremberg – Erlangen – Bamberg – Lichtenfels – Kronach – Probstzella – Saalfeld	60	DB Regio Bayern
RE 15	Saalfeld (Saale) – Rudolstadt – Kahla – Jena Saalbf	120	Abellio
RB 22	Saalfeld (Saale) – Pößneck ob Bf – Weida – Gera – Zeitz – Leipzig	120^{*}	Erfurter Bahn
RB 23	Saalfeld (Saale) – Rottenbach – Stadtilm – Arnstadt – Erfurt	60	Erfurter Bahn
RB 25	Saalfeld (Saale) – Orlamünde – Jena Paradies – Naumburg – Weißenfels – Merseburg – Halle	60	Abellio
RB 32	Saalfeld (Saale) – Wurzbach (Thür) – Bad Lobenstein – Blankenstein (Saale)	120	Erfurter Bahn
* The overlay of lines results in hourly services
