= Bamberg station =

Railway station in Bamberg, Germany

Bamberg
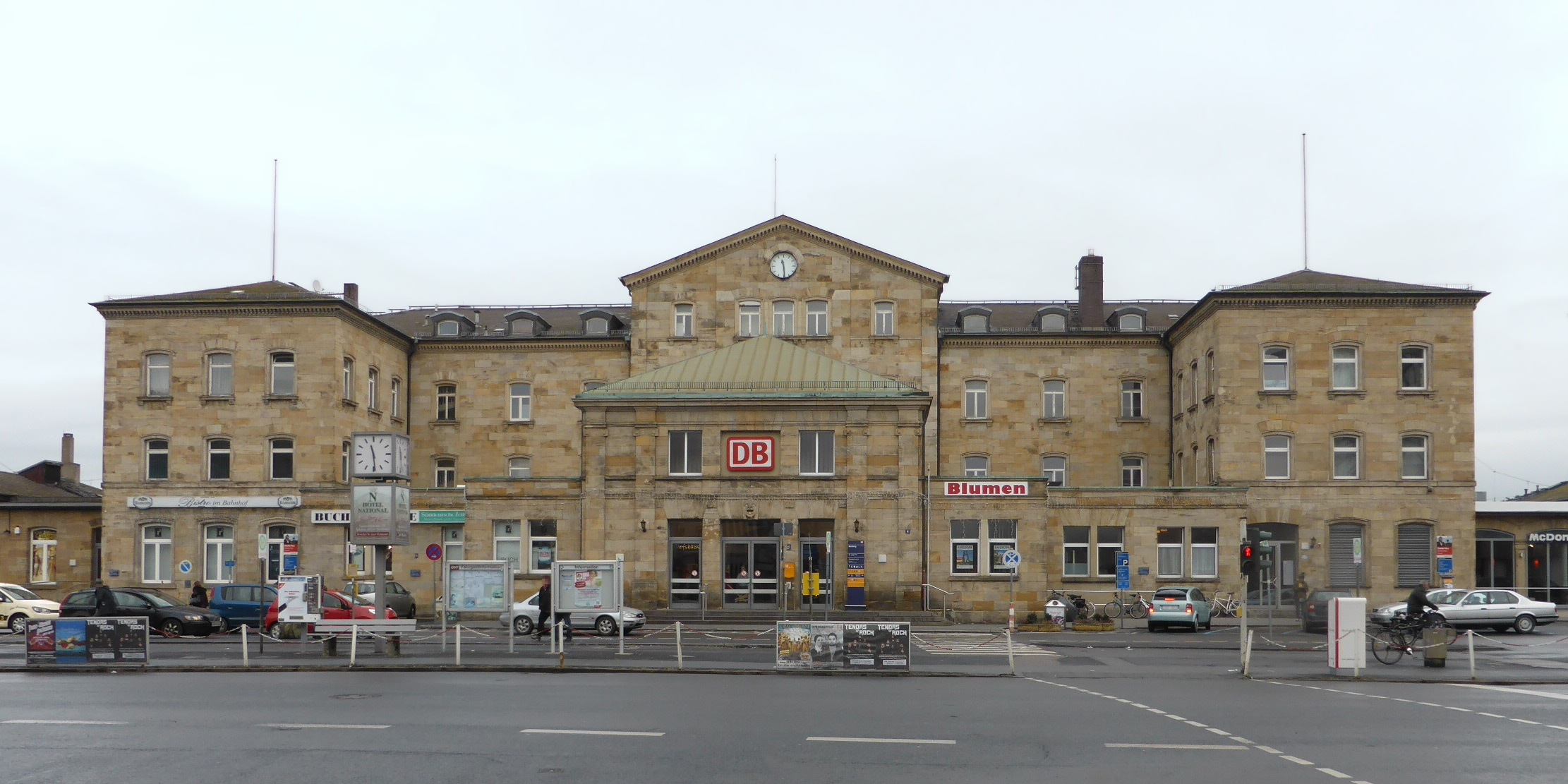
- Station building and forecourt

General information
- Location: Ludwigstr. 6, Bamberg, Bavaria; Germany
- Coordinates: 49°54′3″N 10°53′58″E
- Owner: Deutsche Bahn
- Operator: DB Netz; DB Station&Service
- Lines: Bamberg–Rottendorf (KBS 810); Bamberg–Nuremberg (KBS 820); Bamberg–Hof (KBS 820 / 850); Bamberg–Ebern (KBS 826); Bamberg–Scheßlitz (closed)
- Platforms: 7

Construction
- Accessible: Yes
- Architect: Friedrich Bürklein

Other information
- Station code: 393
- DS100 code: NBA
- IBNR: 8000025
- Category: 2
- Fare zone: VGN: 1101
- Website: stationsdatenbank.de; www.bahnhof.de

History
- Opened: 1 September 1844
Services
Preceding station	DB Fernverkehr	Following station
Lichtenfels towards Berlin Gesundbrunnen	ICE 18	Erlangen towards München Hbf
Coburg towards Berlin Gesundbrunnen or Hamburg-Altona	ICE 18	Erlangen towards München Hbf
Erfurt Hbf towards Hamburg-Altona or Kiel Hbf	ICE 28	Nürnberg Hbf towards München Hbf
Lichtenfels towards Leipzig Hbf	IC 61	Erlangen towards Karlsruhe Hbf
Preceding station	DB Regio Bayern	Following station
Breitengüßbach towards Saalfeld (Saale)	RE 14	Hirschaid towards Nürnberg Hbf
Coburg towards Sonneberg (Thür) Hbf	RE 19	Hirschaid towards Nürnberg Hbf
Haßfurt towards Würzburg Hbf	RE 20	Hirschaid towards Nürnberg Hbf
Breitengüßbach towards Sonneberg (Thür) Hbf	RE 28	Hirschaid towards Nürnberg Hbf
Coburg towards Erfurt Hbf	RE 29	Hirschaid towards Nürnberg Hbf
Terminus	RE 32	Bad Staffelstein towards Nürnberg Hbf
Terminus	RE 35	Bad Staffelstein towards Hof Hbf
Terminus	RE 38	Bad Staffelstein towards Nürnberg Hbf
Haßfurt towards Frankfurt (Main) Hbf	RE 54	Terminus
Haßfurt towards Frankfurt (Main) Hbf	RE 55 Sa+Su	Terminus
Terminus	RB 25	Hallstadt (b Bamberg) towards Kronach
Oberhaid towards Schlüchtern	RB 53	Terminus
Preceding station		Following station
Hallstadt (b Bamberg) towards Lichtenfels	RB 22	Strullendorf towards Ebermannstadt
Hallstadt (b Bamberg) towards Ebern	RB 26	Terminus
Preceding station	Nuremberg S-Bahn	Following station
Terminus	S1	Strullendorf towards Neumarkt (Oberpfalz)
Location

Bamberg station is the only passenger station in the city of Bamberg in Upper Franconia in the German state of Bavaria. It is a major hub station for local trains operated by Deutsche Bahn and Agilis and is also a regularly served by Intercity-Express and Intercity trains. The station is on the Nuremberg–Bamberg, Bamberg–Hof and Bamberg–Rottendorf railway lines. It has seven platform tracks and is classified by Deutsche Bahn as a category 2 station. It is the northern terminus of line S1 of the Nuremberg S-Bahn.

== Location ==
The station is located in eastern Bamberg, northeast of the Regnitz. On its perimeter are the streets of Ludwigstraße to the west, Starkenfeldstraße to the south, which crosses the rail tracks on a bridge, Brennerstraße to the east and Zollnerstraße to the north, which runs in an underpass under the tracks. Luitpoldstraße connects the inner city with Ludwigstraße opposite the station forecourt. The station building is located west of the railway facilities and has the street address of 6 Ludwigstraße.

== History ==
The station was established in 1844 as the terminus of the Nuremberg–Bamberg line built by the Royal Bavarian State Railways. On 25 August 1844, the first train ran into the station, although official operations began in October 1844. Shortly after its opening in April 1845, the station became the headquarters of the Royal Bavarian State Railways in Bamberg. In 1846 the line was extended to Hof in the north. Construction of the building still continued at this time and it was opened in September 1846. The building was designed by the architect Friedrich Bürklein, who designed several stations in Bavaria.

In 1852, the Würzburg-Bamberg, now Bamberg–Rottendorf railway line, was connected to Bamberg Station, which as a result became a railway junction. Therefore, the entrance building was enlarged and gained an additional storey. This conversion was completed in 1858. In 1866, the first signal box was installed at Bamberg station.

From 1897 to 1922, the station forecourt was the main hub of Bamberg trams, which was served by three of the four lines of the network. The trams were closed in 1924 and replaced by buses.

In 1908 another line was opened to Schesslitz. At this time Bamberg also had a locomotive depot. Due to the increase in train services the entrance building was extended again 1900-1908 and received an entrance hall.

In 1939, Deutsche Reichsbahn electrified the railway station together with the lines to Hof and Nuremberg because it was a stop on the major long-distance link between Berlin and Munich. Due to the damage caused to the station during the Second World War, its importance for long-distance traffic declined in the following years. Although the reconstruction was fast, Bamberg station lost further traffic because the establishment of the Soviet occupation zone in 1946 led to the loss of long-distance services.

In 1948 the old mechanical signal boxes were replaced by a new electro-mechanical interlocking.

== Infrastructure ==
The station has seven through tracks running past four platforms, with platform 1 as the home platform. The seventh track is numbered as 8. Each platform is covered and has digital platform displays. All platforms are connected via a pedestrian underpass connected to the home platform. In addition, the station is fully accessible for the handicapped by lifts.

=== Reception Building ===
The three-story historic station building is built of sandstone and is divided by three wings. It has a slightly raised central section, which is extended by a two-story entrance hall and a low pitched tiled roof. The roof of the entrance hall is made of metal. Originally the station had a "prince's room" (Fürstenzimmer), but that has not been preserved. In addition to the reception building, there are three associated buildings north of the station buildings that are protected as monuments.

The station building accommodates a travel centre and shops.

=== Platform data ===
Platform lengths and heights are as follows:

- Track 1: length 140 m, height 55 cm
- Track 2: length 370 m, height 76 cm
- Track 3: length 405 m, height 76 cm
- Track 4 and 5: length 197 m, height 76 cm
- Track 6: length 405 m, height 76 cm
- Track 8: length 378 m, height 76 cm

== Rail services ==
=== Long-distance services ===
Bamberg station is served every two hours by Intercity-Express trains on the Berlin–Munich route. Bamberg station is served by two Intercity train pairs each day.

Line	Route	Interval
ICE 18	Hamburg-Altona – Hamburg – Berlin – Halle – Erfurt – Bamberg – Nuremberg – Augsburg – Munich	Every 2 hours
ICE 28	Hamburg – Berlin – Leipzig – Erfurt – Bamberg – Nuremberg – Ingolstadt / Augsburg – Munich	Every 2 hours
IC 61	Leipzig – Naumburg – Jena Paradies – Saalfeld – Lichtenfels – Bamberg – Nuremberg – Stuttgart – Karlsruhe	2 train pairs

=== Regional services ===
Bamberg is also in regional transport of three Regional-Express routes and two Regionalbahn routes of Deutsche Bahn, as well as a line operated by Agilis. It is also served by line S 1 of the Nuremberg S-Bahn, running to Nuremberg every hour.

Train class	Route			Interval	Rolling stock
RE 42	Franken-Thüringen-Express (FTX): Nuremberg – Fürth – Erlangen – Forchheim – Hirschaid – Bamberg	– Lichtenfels – Saalfeld – Jena – Leipzig		every 2 hours	Class 442 (Talent 2)
RE 20	Franken-Thüringen-Express (FTX): Nuremberg – Fürth – Erlangen – Forchheim – Hirschaid – Bamberg	– Haßfurt – Schweinfurt – Würzburg		every 2 hours_{1}	Class 442 (Talent 2)
RE 49	Franken-Thüringen-Express (FTX): Nuremberg – Fürth – Erlangen – Forchheim – Hirschaid – Bamberg	– Lichtenfels (portions:)	– Coburg – Sonneberg	every 2 hours	Class 442 (Talent 2)
RE 14	Franken-Thüringen-Express (FTX): Nuremberg – Fürth – Erlangen – Forchheim – Hirschaid – Bamberg	– Lichtenfels (portions:)	– Kronach – Saalfeld	every 2 hours	Class 442 (Talent 2)
RE 19	Franken-Thüringen-Express (FTX): Nuremberg – Fürth – Erlangen – Forchheim – Hirschaid – Bamberg	– Coburg (– Sonneberg)		every 2 hours	class 193 + double deck coaches
RE 32	Main-Saale-Express: Bamberg – Lichtenfels – Neuenmarkt-Wirsberg –	Bayreuth (– Pegnitz – Nuremberg)		every 2 hours	Class 612 (RegioSwinger)
RE 35	Main-Saale-Express: Bamberg – Lichtenfels – Neuenmarkt-Wirsberg –	Hof (Saale)		every 2 hours	Class 612 (RegioSwinger)
RE 54	Main-Spessart-Express (MSX): Bamberg – Haßfurt – Schweinfurt – Würzburg – Gemünden – Aschaffenburg – Hanau – Maintal – Frankfurt			every 2 hours	Class 445 (TwinDexx-Vario)
RE 55	Freizeit Express Frankenland: Bamberg – Haßfurt – Schweinfurt – Gemünden – Aschaffenburg – Hanau – Offenbach – Frankfurt			individual service	Class 445 (TwinDexx-Vario)
RB 53	Mainfrankenbahn: (Schlüchtern – Jossa – Gemünden –) Würzburg – Schweinfurt – Haßfurt – Bamberg			every 2 hours	Class 440 (Coradia Continental)
RB 53	Mainfrankenbahn: (Jossa – Gemünden – Würzburg – Schweinfurt –) Haßfurt – Bamberg			every 2 hours	Class 440 (Coradia Continental)
RB 25	(Kronach –) Lichtenfels – Bamberg			hourly	Class 442 (Talent 2)
RB 26	(Forchheim –) Bamberg – Breitengüßbach – Ebern			hourly	Class 650 (Regio-Shuttle RS1)
RB 22	(Lichtenfels –) Bamberg – Forchheim – Ebermannstadt			individual service	Class 650 (Regio-Shuttle RS1)
S1	Bamberg – Forchheim – Erlangen – Fürth – Nuremberg – Lauf – Hersbruck – Hartmannshof			hourly	Class 442 (Talent 2)

=== Public transport links ===
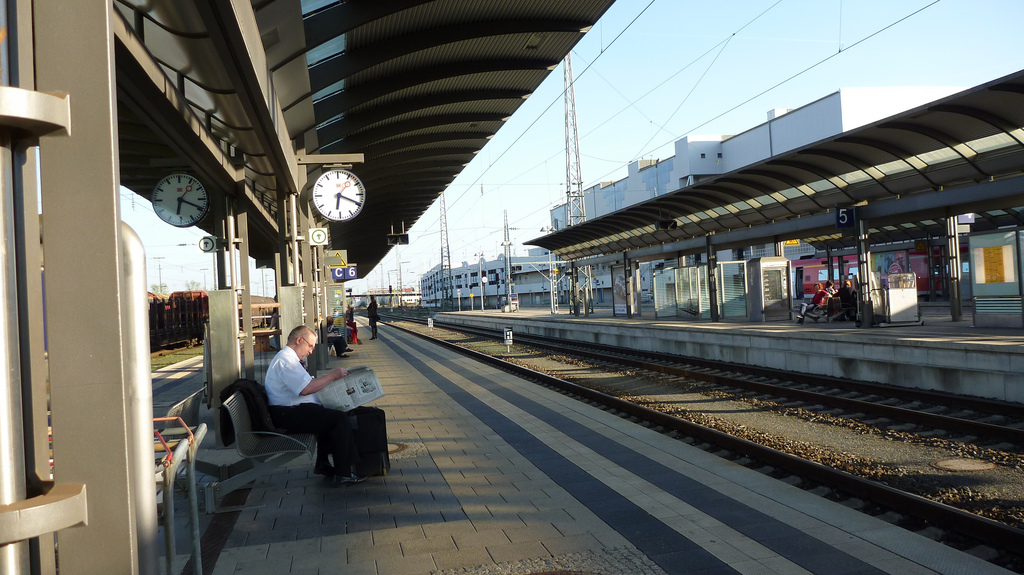
Station, looking to the southeast

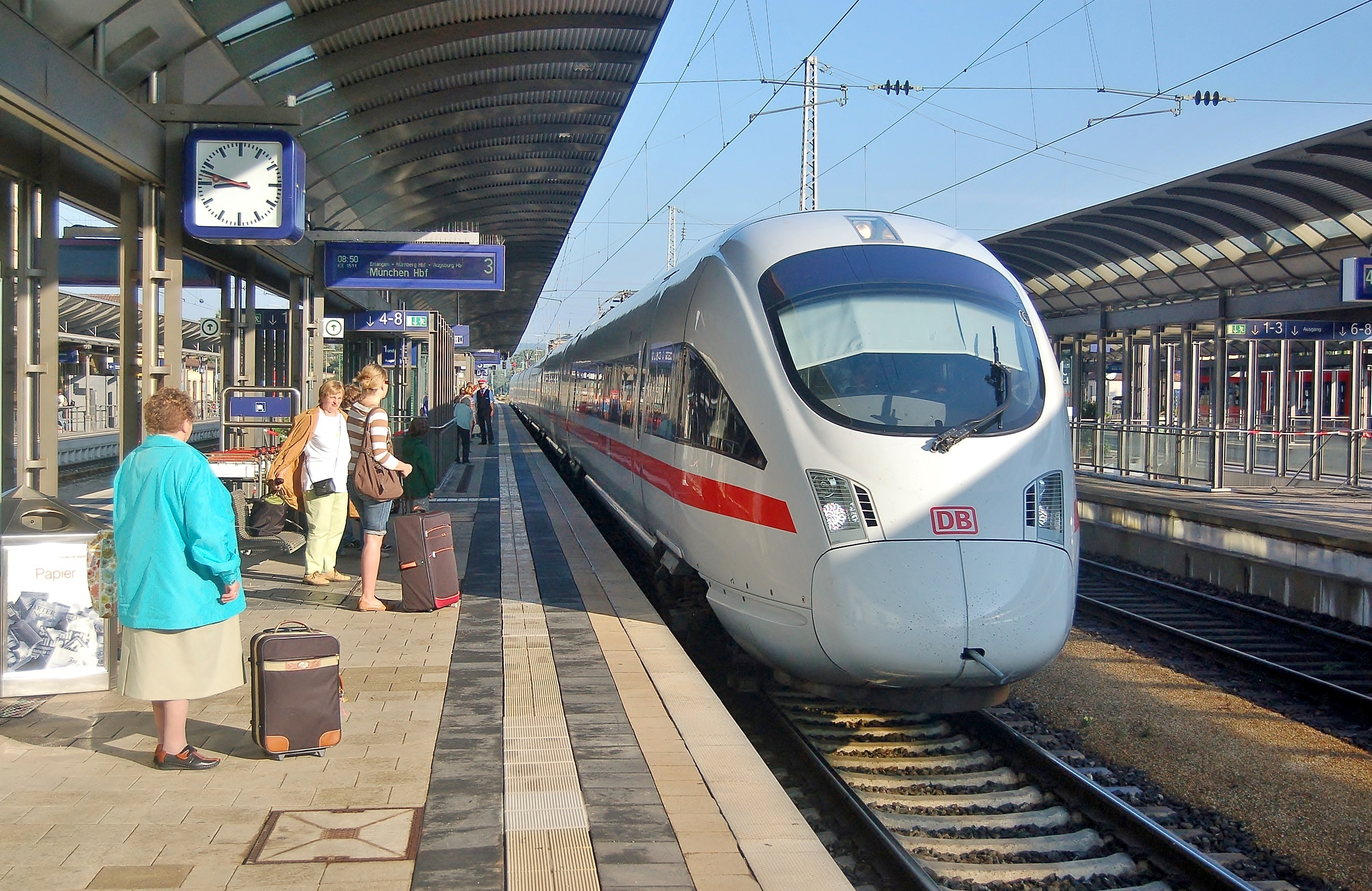
An ICE T arrives at platform 3 with an Intercity-Express to München Hbf in 2006

The bus stop outside the station, which lies south of the station building is served by nine city bus routes operated by Stadtwerke Bamberg. Many of them run on weekdays at 15-minute intervals. The central bus station in the city centre is thus connected by buses approximately every three to five minutes. In addition, there are other bus stops called Bahnhof/Post, Bahnhof Atrium and Bahnhof/Brennerstraße near the station. There are also regional bus services operated by other operators. Taxis are also available at the station forecourt in front of the station building.
