= Lichtenfels station =

Railway station in Lichtenfels, Germany

Lichtenfels
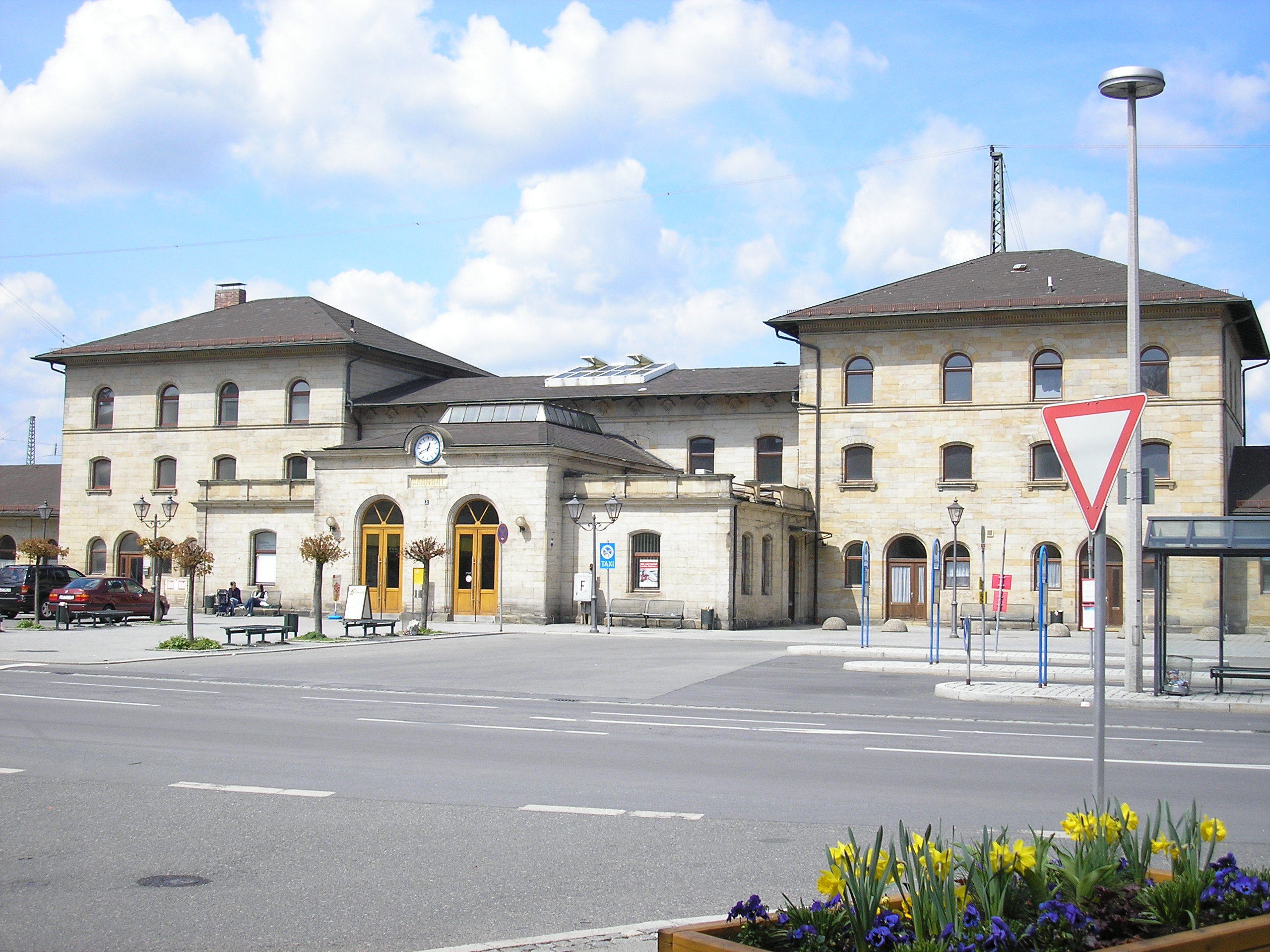
- East facade of the entrance building

General information
- Location: Am Bahnhofsplatz 3, Lichtenfels, Bavaria; Germany
- Coordinates: 50°8′46″N 11°3′35″E
- Owner: Deutsche Bahn
- Operator: DB Netz; DB Station&Service
- Lines: Bamberg–Hof railway; Werra Railway
- Platforms: 6

Construction
- Accessible: Yes
- Architect: Gottfried von Neureuther
- Architectural style: Neo-Renaissance

Other information
- Station code: 3700
- DS100 code: NLF
- IBNR: 8000228
- Category: 3
- Fare zone: VGN: 1301
- Website: www.bahnhof.de

History
- Opened: 15 February 1846
Services
Preceding station	DB Fernverkehr	Following station
Bamberg towards München Hbf	ICE 18	Saalfeld towards Berlin Gesundbrunnen
Bamberg towards München Hbf	ICE 28	Terminus
Bamberg towards Karlsruhe Hbf	IC 61	Kronach towards Leipzig Hbf
Preceding station	DB Regio Bayern	Following station
Bad Staffelstein towards Nürnberg Hbf	RE 14	Hochstadt-Marktzeuln towards Saalfeld (Saale)
Bad Staffelstein towards Nürnberg Hbf	RE 28	Ebersdorf (b Coburg) towards Sonneberg
Ebersdorf (b Coburg) towards Coburg	RE 32	Hochstadt-Marktzeuln towards Nürnberg Hbf
Bad Staffelstein towards Bamberg	RE 35	Hochstadt-Marktzeuln towards Hof Hbf
Bamberg Terminus	RE 38	Burgkunstadt towards Nürnberg Hbf
Bad Staffelstein towards Frankfurt (Main) Hbf	RE 54	Terminus
Bad Staffelstein towards Bamberg	RB 25	Michelau (Oberfr) towards Kronach
Preceding station		Following station
Bad Staffelstein towards Bamberg	RB 22	Terminus
Schney towards Coburg	RB 24	Michelau (Oberfr) towards Bayreuth Hbf
Location

Lichtenfels station is in the town of Lichtenfels in Upper Franconia in the German state of Bavaria. It is a regional rail hub and a former ICE stop on the Hamburg–Berlin Munich route and is classified by Deutsche Bahn as a station of category 3.

== Location ==
Lichtenfels station is 31.9 km from Bamberg on the Bamberg–Hof railway and 150.9 from Eisenach on the Werra Railway at a height of 262.4 metres above sea level and is located west of the town centre and east of the Main river.

== History ==
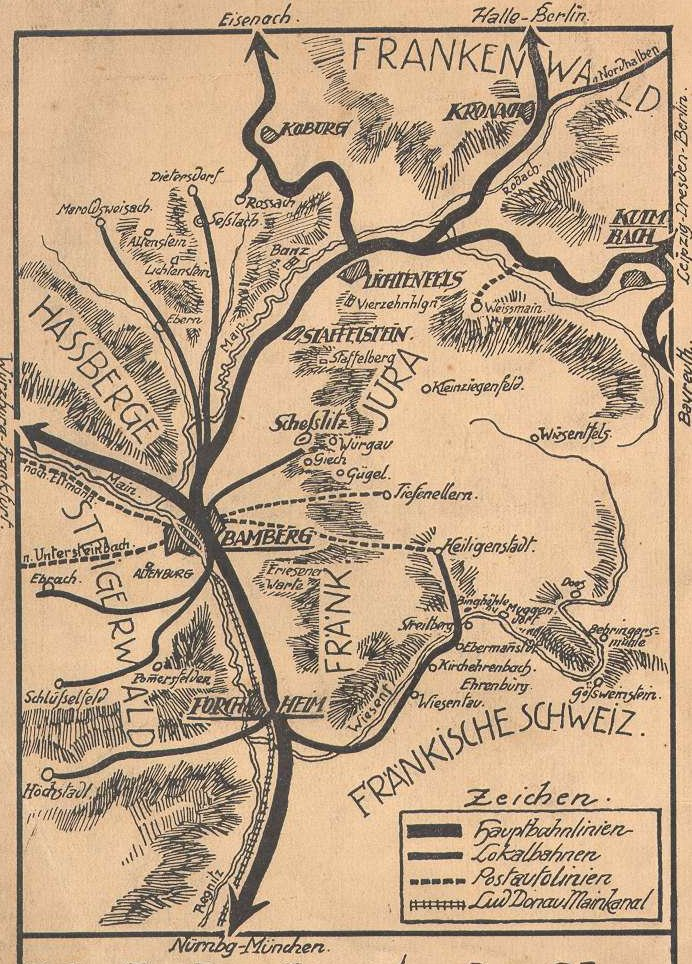
Line map of Lichtenfels area in 1912

Planning of the Bamberg–Lichtenfels section of the Ludwig South-North Railway began in the summer of 1841, and work started shortly later. The line had to penetrate the town's wall, which had to be rebuilt with a new Coburger Tor ("Coburg gate") over the line. The station, together with a depot, was first connected to the line in January 1846. The official opening ceremony followed on 15 February 1846. On 15 October 1846 the line was extended to Neuenmarkt and on 1 November 1848 the line reached its terminus in Hof. The first massive entrance building was a temporary wooden structure built between 1847 and 1850. In January 1859 the Werra Railway was extended to Lichtenfels, making the station a railway hub and requiring the upgrading of the station in 1862 to provide separate tracks for the Werra Railway Company and the Royal Bavarian State Railways. The station gained new significance with the opening of the Franconian Forest Railway to Probstzella in October 1885, part of a new long-distance route to Berlin. The acquisition of the assets of the Werra Railway by the Prussian government in the 1890s was followed by an extensive expansion and restructuring of the railway facilities. The number of running tracks was increased to eleven, with 17 signalman's posts replaced by four signal boxes. Lichtenfels’ station area covered about 30 hectares and the railways employed about 29 percent of the city's workforce in 1914. The Coburger Tor was demolished in 1889. In 1896 the Coburger Straße pedestrian bridge was built over the railway tracks; it was demolished in 1934.

From 1934 to 1936 extensive works were carried out in preparation for the electrification of the line, including the building of a pedestrian underpass to the platforms, a road underpass for Coburger Straße, the raising of the level of the tracks and the installation of modern signal boxes and interlockings. Electric train operations were included in schedules from 15 May 1939.

During the Second World War, the depot was destroyed in an air raid on 23 February 1945. The German army demolished the switches and water cranes on 11 April 1945. 95 percent of the damage had been repaired by the end of 1945.

In the autumn of 1983 a new central interlocking was commissioned to the design of Lorenz. At the beginning of the 21st century this was followed by a further reorganisation of the station. The platforms were redesigned and they received a new roof, lifts, and 76 cm high platforms.

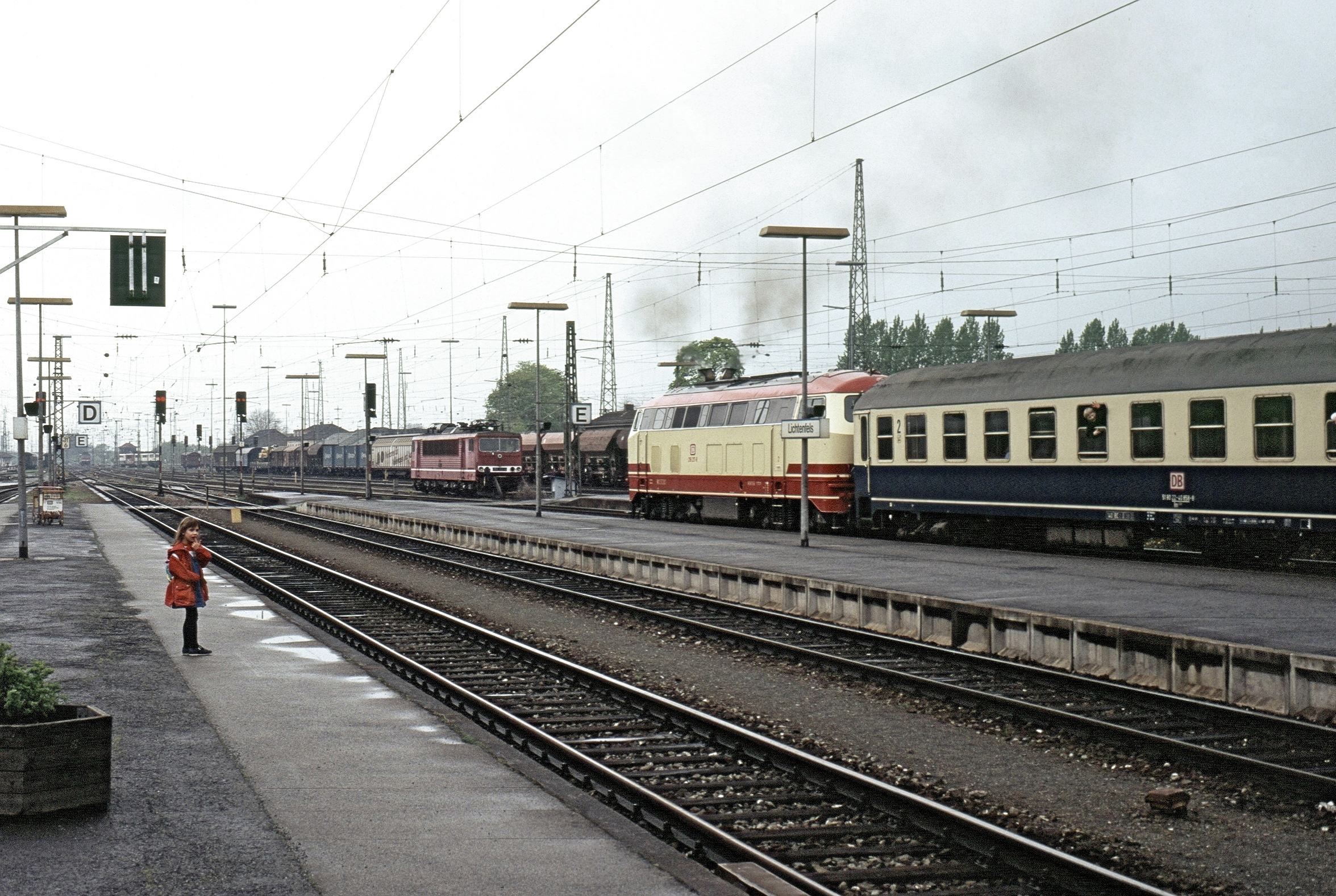
Looking west, a "wrong-coloured" 218 217-8 on the right in 1995

== Passenger services ==
=== Long-distance ===
In Long-distance traffic ICE services on line 28, Hamburg–Berlin–Leipzig–Jena–Nürnberg–Munich, stopped every two hours until December 9, 2017.

With the start of the Ebensfeld–Erfurt high-speed railway in December 2017, it lost its status as a station for long-distance trains. The new line runs a few kilometres to the west of Lichtenfels. Now, the closest regular ICE stop is Bamberg and Intercity trains (Karlsruhe–Leipzig) serve Lichtenfels once a day each way.

Lichtenfels is served by the current long-distance services (2019):

Linie	Route	Frequency
ICE 18	Munich – Augsburg – Nuremberg – Lichtenfels – Leipzig – Berlin – Berlin Gesundbrunnen	One train pair
ICE 28	Lichtenfels – Bamberg – Erlangen – Nuremberg – Ingolstadt – Munich	One train
IC 61	Leipzig – Naumburg – Jena Paradies – Saalfeld – Lichtenfels – Bamberg – Nuremberg – Stuttgart – Karlsruhe	2 train pairs

According to a traffic modelling on behalf of the Coburg Chamber of Commerce in 2014, the station would handle 520 ICE passengers daily, 170 of those changing trains and 340 starting or finishing their journeys at the station.

=== Regional services ===
In regional transport, Lichtenfels is a hub with hourly connections to Upper Franconia and South Thuringia. The station is the start or end point for Regionalbahn connections and a through station for an agilis connection and three Regional-Express services:

Line	Route		Frequency	Operator	Rolling stock
RE 14	Franken-Thüringen-Express: Nuremberg – Fürth – Erlangen – Bamberg – Lichtenfels –	Kronach – Saalfeld	120 min	DB Regio Bayern	Siemens Desiro HC (class 1462)
RE 28	Franken-Thüringen-Express: Nuremberg – Fürth – Erlangen – Bamberg – Lichtenfels –	Coburg	120 min	DB Regio Bayern	Siemens Desiro HC (class 1462)
RE 32	Main-Saale-Express: Bamberg – Lichtenfels – Neuenmarkt-Wirsberg –	Bayreuth (– Nuremberg)	Every 2 hours	DB Regio Bayern	RegioSwinger (class 612)
RE 35	Main-Saale-Express: Bamberg – Lichtenfels – Neuenmarkt-Wirsberg –	Hof	Every 2 hours	DB Regio Bayern	RegioSwinger (class 612)
RE 38	Main-Saale-Express: Bamberg Lichtenfels – Neuenmarkt-Wirsberg – Bayreuth – Nürnberg		Every 2 hours	DB Regio Bayern	RegioSwinger (class 612)
RE 54	Main-Spessart-Express: Lichtenfels –> Bamberg – Haßfurt – Schweinfurt – Würzburg – Gemünden – Aschaffenburg – Hanau – Maintal – Frankfurt		1 train	DB Regio Bayern	Twindexx Vario (class 445)
RB 22	Kulmbach → Lichtenfels → Bamberg		2 trains	Agilis	Stadler Regio-Shuttle RS1 (class 650)
RB 24	Bayreuth – Kulmbach – Lichtenfels – Coburg		Hourly	Agilis	Stadler Regio-Shuttle RS1 (class 650)
RB 25	(Kronach–) – Lichtenfels – Bamberg		Hourly	DB Regio Bayern	Siemens Desiro HC (class 1462)

Since December 2013, the regional express service, Würzburg–Bamberg–Lichtenfels–Bayreuth/Hof, has been divided into two lines. DB Regio Franken won the tender for services from 2015 in the Main-Spessart region and now operates to Bamberg, some services extended to Frankfurt via Würzburg. The Bamberg– Lichtenfels–Bayreuth/Hof route continues to be operated by DB Regio Oberfranken.

== Tracks ==
The station has eleven through tracks, some without access to platforms. On its three island platforms lie platform tracks 1 and 2 (170 m long), 3 and 5 (370 m) and 6 and 7 (210 m). These are accessed by an underpass, connected by stairs and elevators. There is no longer a platform attached to the main building.

In the roundhouse of the old railway depot contains some locomotives of the Nuremberg Transport Museum.

== Entrance building ==
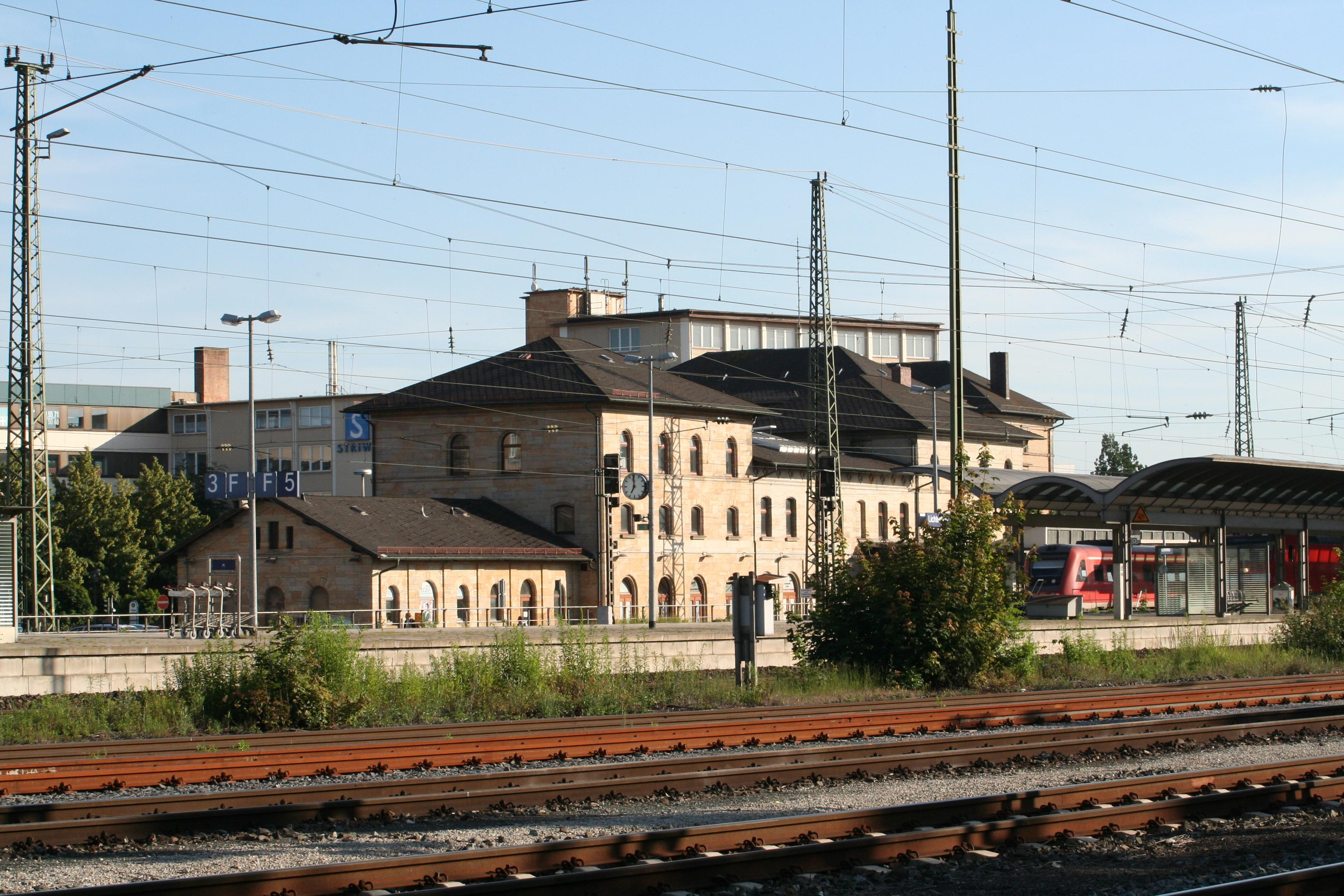
Western view

The entrance building was built in 1848 and 1849 to an 1847 design of the architect Gottfried Neureuther. It consisted of a three-story central building with four windows and on both sides it had three-storey wings. In 1859/60 the wings were extended. In 1862 the station building was completely reconstructed in a Renaissance Revival style. It was south of an additional building that was designed similar to the old central building and connected to it by a three-storey building. In 1886 a symmetrical reception building was added. The station building is now listed as a monument by the Bavarian government.
