= Kronach station =

Railway station in Kronach, Germany

Kronach
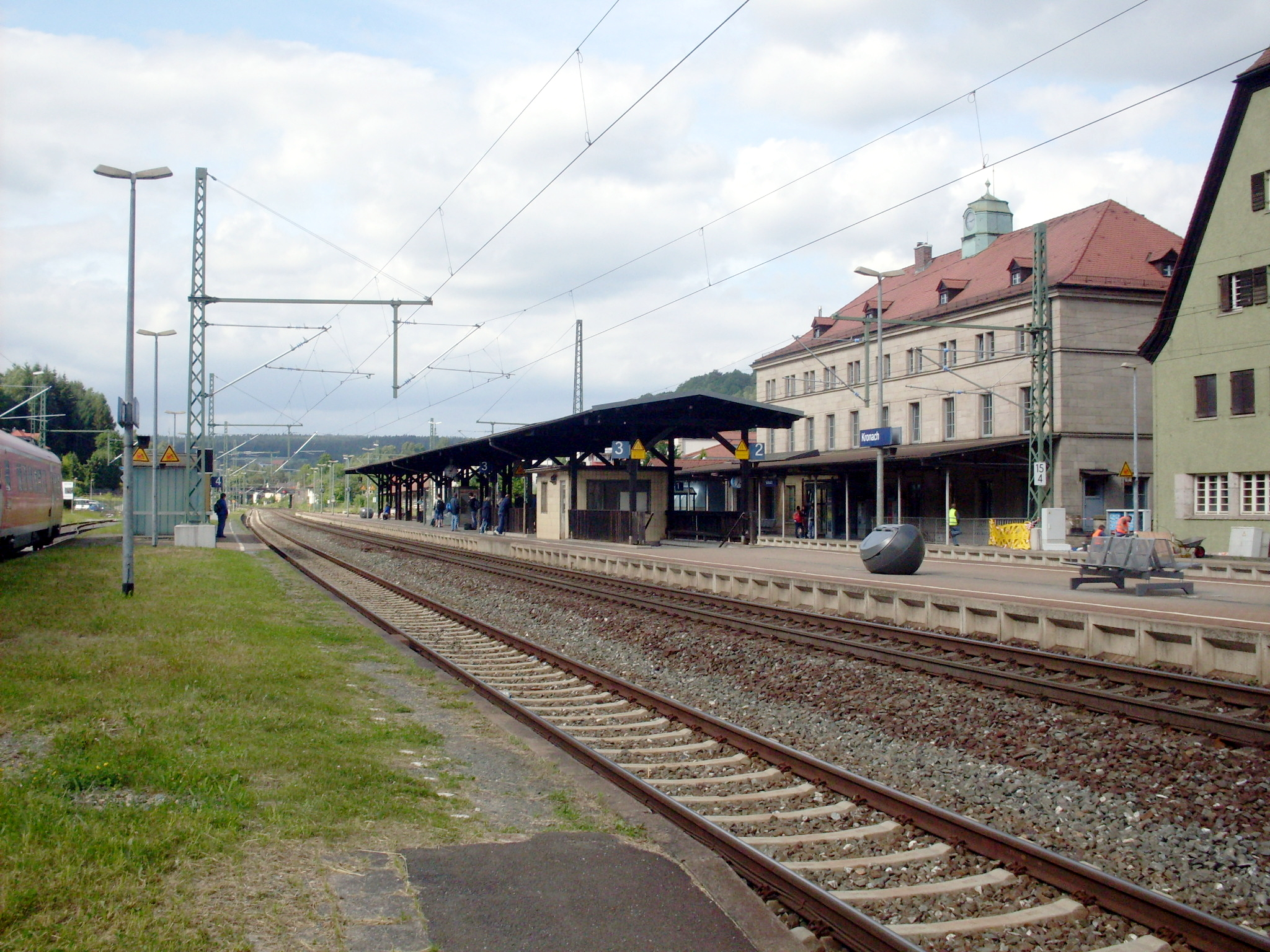
- 2009

General information
- Location: Bahnhofsplatz 6; 96317 Kronach; Bavaria; Germany
- Coordinates: 50.2396°N 11.3205°E
- Elevation: 305 m (1,001 ft)
- Owner: Deutsche Bahn
- Operator: DB Netz; DB Station&Service
- Lines: Franconian Forest Railway; Kronach–Nordhalben railway
- Platforms: 2 island platforms 1 side platform
- Tracks: 5
- Train operators: DB Fernverkehr; DB Regio Bayern

Construction
- Parking: yes
- Cycle facilities: yes
- Accessible: partly

Other information
- Station code: 3427
- DS100 code: NK
- IBNR: 8003446
- Category: 5
- Website: www.bahnhof.de

History
- Opened: 20 February 1861; 165 years ago

Services
Preceding station	DB Fernverkehr	Following station
Lichtenfels towards Karlsruhe Hbf	IC 61	Ludwigsstadt towards Leipzig Hbf
Preceding station	DB Regio Bayern	Following station
Küps towards Nürnberg Hbf	RE 14	Gundelsdorf towards Saalfeld (Saale)
Neuses (b Kronach) towards Bamberg	RB 25	Terminus
Location
- Location within Bavaria Location within Germany Location within Europe

Kronach station is a railway station in the town of Kronach, located in the Kronach district in Upper Franconia, Bavaria, Germany.
