= S1 (Nuremberg) =

Overview
- Service type: Nuremberg S-Bahn
- Locale: Nuremberg
- Current operator(s): DB Regio Franken

Technical
- Rolling stock: Alstom Coradia Continental (DB Class 1440)

The S1 is a service on the Nuremberg S-Bahn. It is 99.6 km (61.9 mi) long and runs from Bamberg via Erlangen, Fürth and Nuremberg to Hartmannshof.

== History ==
The line opened on September 26, 1987, with initial service from Nuremberg main station to Lauf (links der Pegnitz). With the December 2010 schedule change, it was extended to Bamberg via Fürth and Erlangen. The 2023 schedule change brought a further change: instead of Hartmannshof, the S1 would now serve the branch toward Neumarkt in der Oberpfalz.

== Upgrades and service extensions ==
In the course of the VDE8 Nuremberg–Erfurt high-speed railway, the existing line between Bamberg and Nuremberg is extended to quadruple tracks. However, within the city boundaries of Fürth this planned upgrade ran into problems. As the original plans called for the two S-Bahn tracks to be laid east of the existing line to connect a (then planned but since scrapped) new industrial development between the cities of Nuremberg Fürth and Erlangen, the existing station of "Vach" would have lost passenger rail service and would have been replaced with two new stations called "Fürth Steinach" and "Fürth Stadeln". The city of Fürth however sued against those plans and won in court bringing construction to a halt and leaving many unconnected and half built sections of track. To enable a roughly twenty minute headway along the busy section of track (commuters commute in both directions between Nuremberg and Erlangen all day) and to make use of the already built infrastructure, plans existed to build seven switches to enable more frequent and reliable service. A completion date was tentatively given as 2022. The temporary solution was opened on 31 May 2022.

== Network ==
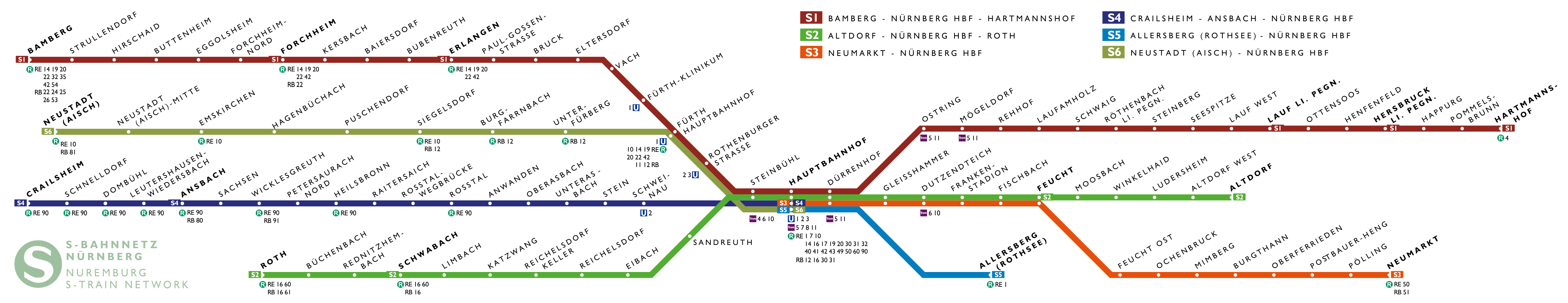
S-Bahn network map (as of Dezember 2017)
