= Eichstätter Garten =

Botanical garden in Eichstätt, Germany

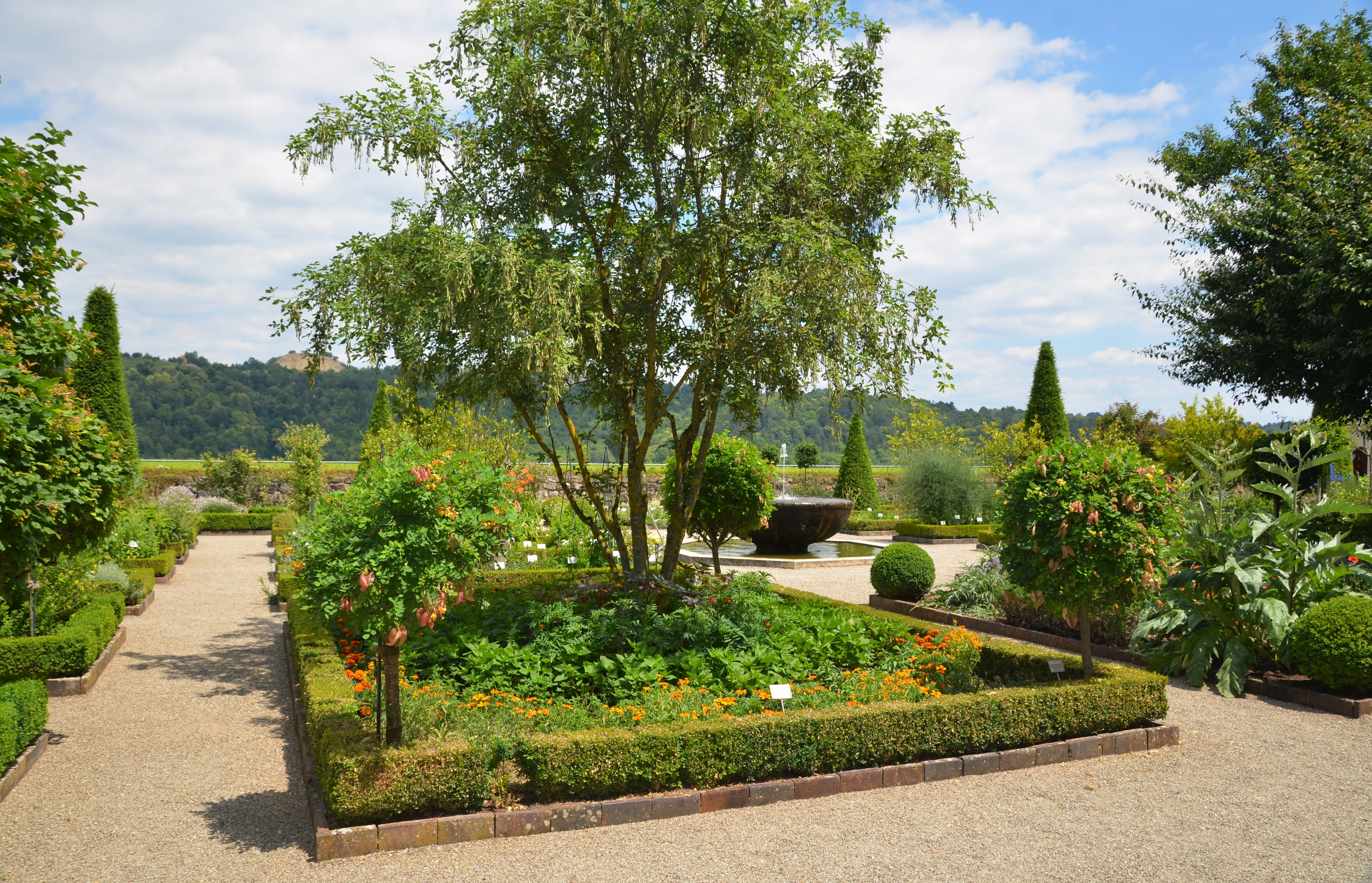
- Bastion garden at Willibaldsburg
- Interactive map of Eichstätter Garten
- Type: Botanic Garden
- Location: Eichstätt, Upper Bavaria, Germany
- Coordinates: 48°53′39″N 11°10′16″E
- Website: Bastion Garden – Eichstätt (Willibaldsburg Castle)

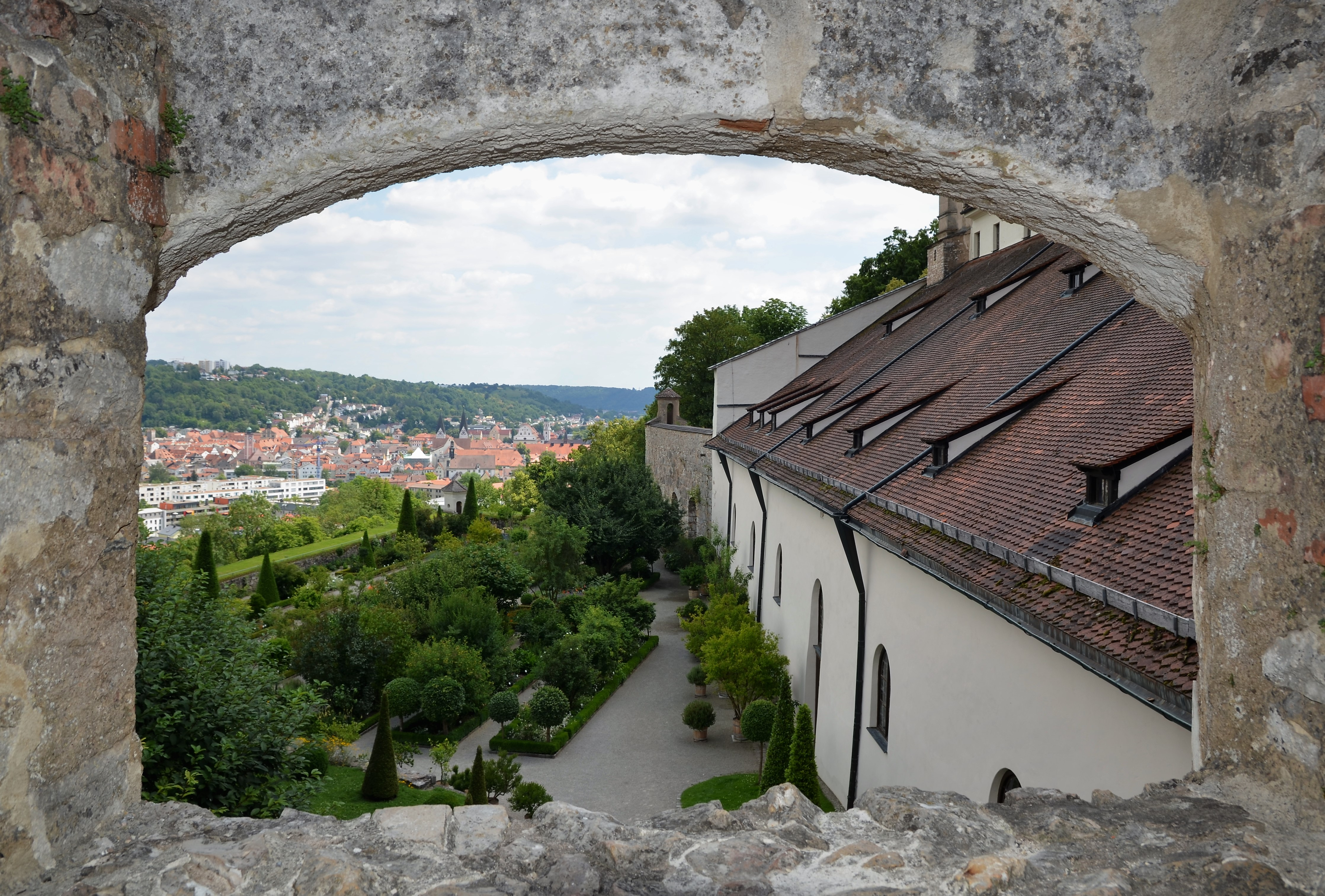
View from the ramparts

The Eichstätter Garten or Hortus Eystettensis ("Eichstätt Garden"), also known as the Bastionsgarten (Bastion garden) was a botanical garden that was created during the Renaissance period under Prince-Bishop Johann Konrad von Gemmingen on the bastions of the Willibaldsburg in Eichstätt, Upper Bavaria. The plants in the garden were described in the magnificent botanical work Hortus Eystettensis, which was first published in 1613 on behalf of the Prince-Bishop.

== Historic garden ==
=== Schaumberg era ===
Gardens at Willibaldsburg date back at least as early as Prince Bishop Martin von Schaumberg (1560–1590) who laid out "new gardens […] behind the palace". The plan of Schaumberg's garden was described by stating that he had "run walls around the castle and the gardens, also renovated the fountains and water-works and put them to better use in various places in the castle, and had made all the preparations, borders, steps, pathways and turns this necessitated". He filled in the moat, which was spanned by a bridge between the forecastle and the outerworks, with vault constructions. He also created a level area for a new building. At his funeral, the oration recognised him for having "built the new gardens, summerhouses and summer palaces so splendidly", (Note: Lorentz Eiszeph, suffragan bishop) while his obituary, by Philipp Menzel, (Note: Professor and poet laureate, Ingolstadt University) referred to the irrigation schemes and fragrance of exotic flowers.

=== Gemmingen era ===
Prince-Bishop Johann Konrad von Gemmingen (1595–1612) immediately commenced plans to expand the existing structures and commissioned Joachim Camerarius the Younger (1534–1598), a physician and botanist, to supervise the project, which was implemented from 1597. After Camerarius died the following year, Gemmingen asked the Nuremberg pharmacist Basilius Besler (1561–1629) to take his place. Besler noted that the soil surrounding the castle had been much improved with earth from the valley below. Records of the expenses relating to the garden and the round tower pavilion, dating back to 1599, survive.

The Hortus Eystettensis consisted of eight garden areas around the residence on the Willibaldsberg. The Prince-Bishop's love of nature was probably not the only decisive factor in laying out the garden, the complex with the precious and exotic plants was also a representation of his princely power. Philipp Hainhofer provided a detailed description of the garden on his visit there in 1611. He mentions how he;

... went into eight gardens around the castle, which is situated on rock ... all of which are arranged differently with flowerbeds, flowers, especially beautiful roses, lilies, tulips ... some of which are embellished with painted rooms and summerhouses, including in one room a round ebony table, the leaf and foot of which are inlaid with silver engraved flowers and insects ... the gardens are all going to be turned round as well and levelled with each other around the castle.

The gardens were created from stones cut from a quarry below the castle. Gemmingen described the pre-existing garden as meinem wenig enges Gärtlein (my narrow little garden)) which he envisaged as becoming much more spacious and integrated. By the time that Hainhofer visited them, they extended within the ramparts, around the castle as well as the inner courtyards. The Prince-Bishop had a belvedere balcony (altane) constructed in front of his room full of plants and small trees in containers, visible through the glass windows. Here he would scatter food to attract birds. Water to irrigate also flowed through a pipe in the room, so that the sound of running water could be heard. This led to a complex irrigation system of pipes, pillars and a brook bringing water to the entire garden. Beneath the belvedere were two stories of treasure vaults, accessed from the Prince-Bishop's ante-chamber via a spiral staircase from the belvedere which continued down to the hare pit and over a bridge to the outer ward. This staircase was called the "botanical staircase" because it was fitted with wooden panels painted with flowers. It was constructed before Elias Holl's new building, the Gemmingenbau.

Gemmingen has planned for his garden to be the first to include all the plants known at the time, including many imported from distant lands. One of the reasons that the garden became famous was the variety of what were then considered exotic plants, including potatoes, sunflowers and tomatoes, (Note: The tomato had a variety of exotic names including "love apple" and "paradise apple") tulips and figs. A number of the plants found their way from the Americas by way of Spanish and Portuguese sailors. Apart from Camerarius, other plants came from the collection of Carolus Clusius (1526–1609) in Leiden and from traders in the Netherlands. In Gemmingen's time, about half of the plants he introduced had become naturalised within Germany. A third came from the Mediterranean, about ten per cent from the Middle East, India and Asia, and a few from the Americas, but very few from Africa. The garden is best known for the florilegium commissioned by Gemmingen and prepared and published by Besler in Latin in 1613 as Hortus Eystettensis. Some paintings from the staircase appeared in this work.

=== Decline and loss ===
After the death of the Prince-Bishop in 1612, the garden was neglected. Parts of the garden were lost in favor of extensions to the bastion. The garden was damaged during the Thirty Years' War (1618–1648). Restoration began in 1648 under Prince-Bishop Marquard II Schenk von Castell (1637–1685), and the last time the garden was intact was under Prince-Bishop Johann Anton I Knebel von Katzenelnbogen (1705–1725). After that, there was only a kitchen garden.

The gardeners lived outside the castle. From ca. 1710–12, the so-called botanist's house below the castle on Mondscheinweg has been preserved as a stable house, the renovation of which was completed by the Bavarian State in 2007. A fountain bowl from the 17th century has been preserved from the stone garden decoration of the Prince-Bishop's garden.

== Bastion Garden ==
The modern Bastionsgarten (Bastion Garden), newly built by the Bavarian Palace Administration on the northern bastion of the outer bailey, the Schmiede-Bastion, opened in 1998 and testifies to the former splendor of the Prince-Bishop's garden. It is unclear where the historic garden actually was. It serves as an information resource for both the historic garden and florilegium.

The reconstruction was based on the account by the French botanist Gérard G. Aymonin in the 1988 facsimile edition of the Hortus Eystettensis. The project was led by Bernd Ringholz and the planning and layout as well as procurement of historical varieties and their planting took almost five years.

The area around the Willibaldsburg has undergone major changes since the original garden fell into neglect in the 18th century, making it impossible to reconstruct the original. The current garden occupies about 1500 sq m. and is laid out in the shape of an open book, as a tribute to Besler, and as in the Hortus, is organised by season. In the north-west is Spring, and moves from there through to winter. About half of the 1,048 plants that were illustrated in Besler's book are found in the modern garden. In 2013, an exhibition opened at the garden featuring the "exotic" plants of the historic garden to be found in the modern reconstruction.

== See also ==
- List of botanical gardens in Germany

== Bibliography ==
=== Books ===
- BSV (2005). Hortus Eystettensis: ein vergessener Garten? [Hortus Eystettensis: A forgotten garden?] (Exhibition catalogue) (in German). Bayerische Schlösserverwaltung. ISBN 978-3-932982-64-4.
- Barker, Nicolas (1994). Hortus Eystettensis: The Bishop's Garden and Besler's Magnificent Book. H.N. Abrams. ISBN 978-0-8109-3424-5.
- Burger, Daniel (1996). Von der Burg zum Schloß: Die Willibaldsburg im 16 Jahrhundert. Sammelblatt des historischen Vereins Eichstätt (in German). Vol. 88–89. Eichstätt: Brönner.
- Glaser, Sabine (2000) [1982 Manfred F. Fischer]. Die Willibaldsburg in Eichstätt: Amtlicher Führer [Official Guide] (in German) (Revised ed.). Bayer. Verw. der Staatl. Schlösser, Gärten und Seen. ISBN 978-3-932982-08-8.(Official site)
- Hofmann, Mara; Zöhl, Caroline (2003). Hortus Eystettensis. Studien zur Entstehung des Kupferstichwerks und zum Exemplar des Andrea Vendramin [Hortus Eystettensis. Studies on the creation of the copper engravings and on the copy of Andrea Vendramin] (in German). Heidelberg University. doi:10.11588/artdok.00000963.
- Schulze, Sabine, ed. (2006). Gärten. Ordnung - Inspiration - Glück. Ostfildern: Hatje Cantz Verlag; Städel Museum. ISBN 3-7757-1870-2.

=== Articles ===
- Boegl, Bruno (1958). "Ein "wenig enges Gärtlein" Johann Konrad von Gemmingens "Hortus Eystettensis" [A "little narrow garden" Johann Konrad von Gemmingen's "Hortus Eystettensis]. Orion (in German). 13: 902–906.
- Kinderman, Udo (1975). "Daniel Papebrochs Reisebericht über Nürnberg, Ellingen, Weißenburg und Eichstätt aus dem Jahre 1660". Zeitschrift für bayerische Kirchengeschichte (in German). 44: 60–97.(see also Daniel Papebroch)
- Redl, Hermann (15 June 2018). "Die zweite Blüte des Hortus Eystettensis". Donau Kurier: Eichstatt (in German).

=== Historical sources ===
- Eiszeph, Laurentius (1590). Leychpredig Bey der Christlichen Begräbnuß weyland deß hochwirdigen Fürsten und Herren. Herrn Martin von Schaumberg Bischoffen zu Eystett. Ingolstadt.
- Turner, Robert (1580). Roberti Tvrneri Devonii. Oratio et Epistola de Vita et Morte Reverendissimi Et Illvstrissimi Dn. Martini A Schavmberg, Principis & Episcopi Eystadiani: illa in funere 3. Non. Iul. An. 1590. Eystadii habita: haec scripta Romam ad Reverendissimum et Illustrissimum Dn. Gvlielmvm Alanum S. R. E. Cardinalem. Subnexum estclarissimi vir D. Philippi Menzelii, Medicinae Doctoris et Profssoris Ingolstadtiani carmen de eadem re elegantissimum (in Latin). Ingolstadt: Wolfgangi Ederi.
- Häutle, Christian (1881). "Die Reisen des Augsburger Philipp Hainhofer nach Eichstädt, München und Regensburg in den Jahren 1611, 1612 und 1613". Zeitschrift des Historischen Vereins für Schwaben und Neuburg (in German). 8: 1–316.(reprinted in Hofmann & Zöhl (2003, pp. 181–185))

=== Websites ===
- Stadt Eichstätt (2022a). "Bastionsgarten mit Pflanzen aus dem Hortus Eystettensis". Eichstätt: Die vielschichtige Altmühlstadt - Urlaub: Sehenswuerdigkeiten (in German).
- Stadt Eichstätt (2022b). "Geschichtstafel der Stadt Eichstätt". Eichstätt: Die vielschichtige Altmühlstadt - Leben: Stadtgeschichte (in German).
- "Willibaldsburg Castle – Eichstätt: Bastionsgarten". Bayerische Schlösserverwaltung - Palaces. Bayerische Verwaltung der staatlichen Schlösser, Gärten und Seen. 2022.
  - BSV (8 May 2013). "Von Sonnenblum, Honigbaum und Liebesapfel: Sonderausstellung zum "Hortus Eystettensis" auf der Willibaldsburg in Eichstätt eröffnet" [Of sunflowers, honey trees and candy apples: Special exhibition on the "Hortus Eystettensis" opening at the Willibaldsburg in Eichstätt]. Press (Press release) (in German). Bayerische Schlösserverwaltung.
  - BSV (17 April 2017). "Söder: Freistaat investiert 14,3 Millionen Euro: Planungsauftrag für Willibaldsburg Eichstätt erteilt" [Markus Söder - The Free State is investing 14.3 million euros: Planning order for Willibaldsburg Eichstätt issued]. Press Nr. 166/17 (Press release) (in German). Bayerische Schlösserverwaltung.

=== Editions of Hortus Eystettensis ===
- Besler, Basilius (1613). Hortus Eystettensis sive diligens et accurata omnium plantarum, florum, stirpium ex variis orbis terrae partibus singulari studio collectarum, quae in celeberrimis viridiariis arcem episcopalem ibidem cingentibus hoc tempore conspiciuntur, delineatio et ad vivum repraesentatio. 3 vols (in Latin). Nürnberg.
- — (1640) [1613]. Hortus Eystettensis, sive, Diligens et accurata omnium plantarum, florum, stirpium: ex variis orbis terrae partibus, singulari studio collectarum, quae in celeberrimis viridariis arcem episcopalem ibidem cingentibus, olim conspiciebantur delineatio et ad vivum repraesentatio et advivum repraesentatio opera (in Latin). Nürnberg.
- — (1988) [1613]. Aymonin, Gérard G. (ed.). L' herbier des quatre saisons ou Le jardin d'Eichstätt. Paris: Citadelles. ISBN 2-85088-034-5.(Facsimile of a hand-colored copy of the first edition of Hortus Eystettensis in the Bibliothèque Nationale de Paris)
- Ringholz, Bernd (2018). "Anmerkungen zum heutigen Bastionsgarten". In Littger, Klaus Walter; Dressendörfer, Werner (eds.). Der Garten von Eichstätt. Hortus Eystettensis [Notes on the Bastion Garden of today] (in German). Universalis Taschen Verlag. pp. 520–521. ISBN 978-3-8365-5785-6.(reprint of the copy kept in the University Library of Eichstätt; see also English edition -)
  - Besler, Basilius (2016) [1613]. Littger, Klaus Walter; Dressendörfer, Werner (eds.). Florilegium: The Book of Plants - The Complete Plates. Taschen. ISBN 978-3-8365-5787-0.
