= Willibaldsburg =

Bavarian Castle

- Eichstätt
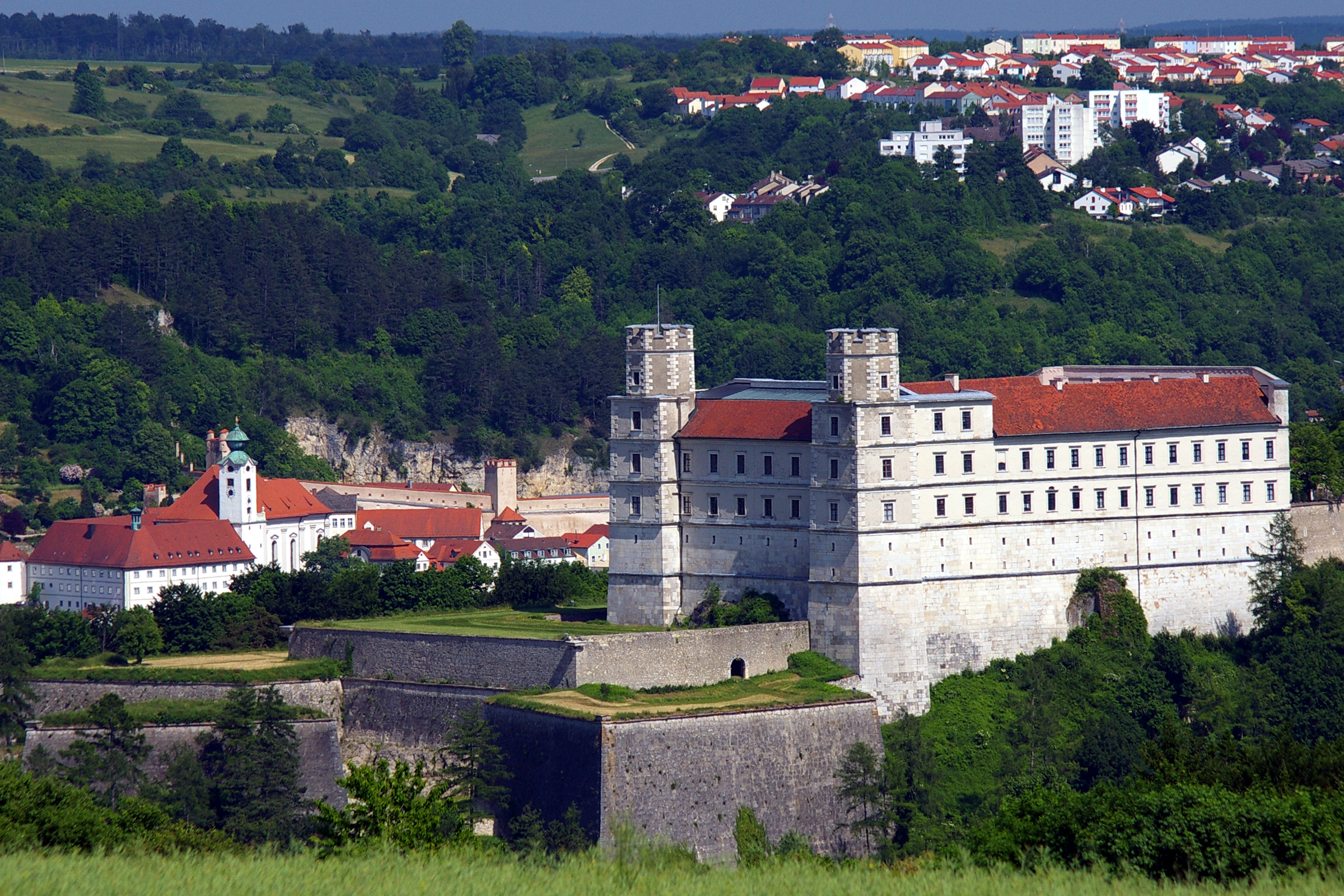
- The Willibaldsburg from the west, with bastions and Gemmingenbau

Site information
- Type: hill castle, spur castle
- Code: DE-BY
- Condition: Preserved or largely preserved

Location
- Coordinates: 48°53′41″N 11°10′08″E
- Height: 464 m above sea level (NN)

Site history
- Built: 1070/1353

The Willibaldsburg is a spur castle, built around the year 1353, in Eichstätt in Upper Bavaria. Until the middle of the 18th century, it was the representative castle and seat of Eichstätt's prince-bishops.

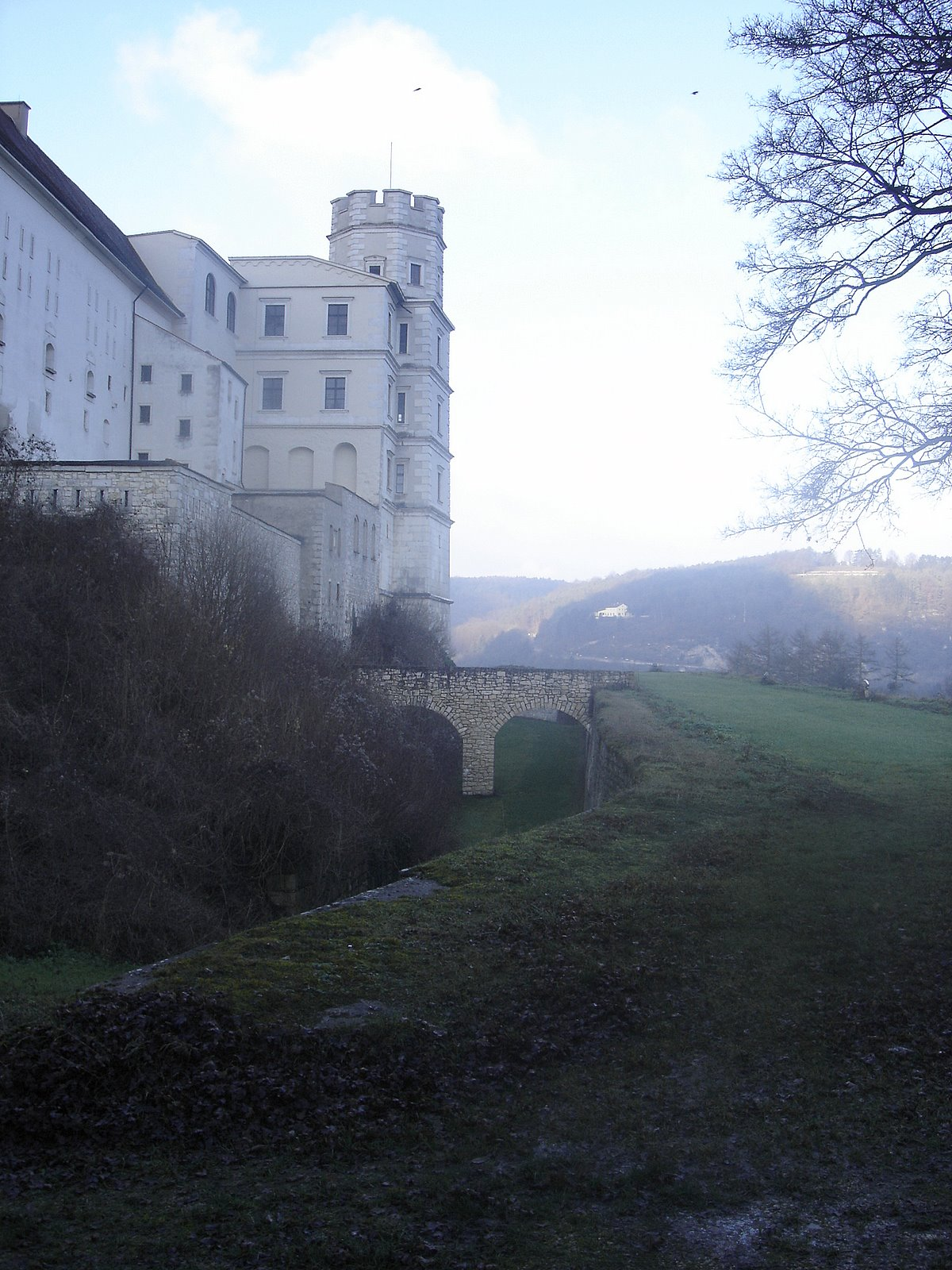
The Willibaldsburg, northeast side with moat and bridge

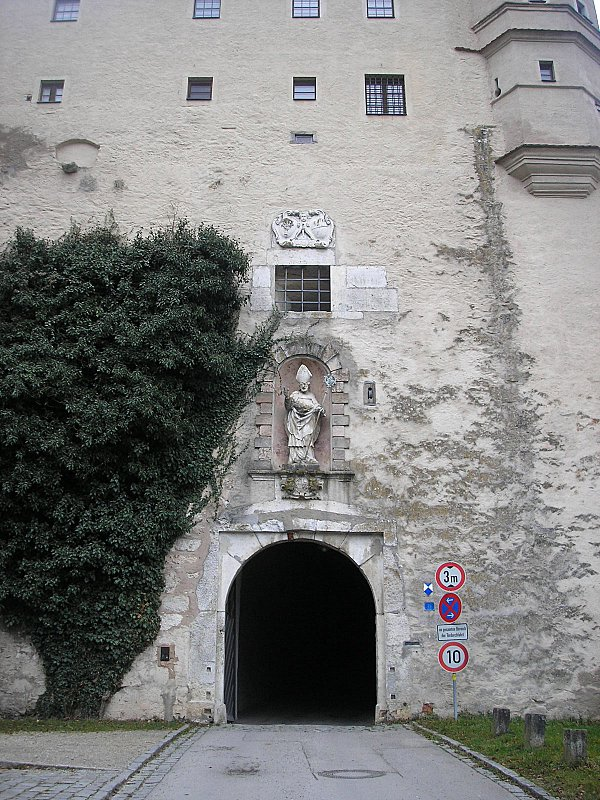
Main gate from the East, with statue of St Willibald above and entrance to gate hall, leading to inner courtyard

== Location ==
This fortified palace lies west of the Old Town on an elongated hill ridge, the Willibaldsberg at an elevation of 464 m above sea level, overlooking the Altmühl valley, the eastern portion being referred to as the Frauenberg. To the east across the valley lies the cathedral city of Eichstätt, and on the western side of the valley loop, Marienstein. Its total length is about 420 metres and it is naturally well protected thanks to this location. The Altmühl river here forms a sharp bend which, due to the resulting ridge was an ideal spot for the medieval castle and later fortress. It derives its name from the first bishop Willibald von Eichstätt (c. 700 – c.787). The castle and city lie within the Altmühl Valley Nature Park in the cultural region of Franconia.

== History ==
=== Beginnings ===
The first fortifications on the castle hill are mentioned as early as 1070. Under Bishop Berthold von Nürnburg, also known as Berthold von Zollern (1355-1365), expansion into a fortified residence for the bishops of Eichstätt began around 1355, the old bishopric being in the city next to the cathedral. This High Medieval edifice, which lay on the western spur of the hill was probably a large stone house, a tower and a chapel, protected by surrounding curtain walls and moats. After the Counts of Hirschberg died out in 1305, the bishops had to organize the military security of the diocese themselves. The cathedral chapter initially opposed the expansion plans because of the high costs, but the bishop was able to prevail.

Bishop Frederick IV of Oettingen (1383-1415) strengthened the fortifications by building a Zwinger kennel and had an "aestuarium magnum aestivale" built. This is likely to have been a hall building, a summer house, as seen in other castles of this time.

=== Middle Ages and Renaissance ===
Under the bishops Albrecht II von Hohenrechberg (1429-1445) and Martin von Schaumberg (1560-1590), the castle vestment was expanded and strengthened. Within 50 years, the Willibaldsburg underwent a major transformation from a late mediaeval castle through a stately fortified Counter-Reformation edifice under Schaumberg, to a late Renaissance summer palace under Bishop Johann Konrad von Gemmingen (1595–1612). Schaumberg made major changes to the front of the eastern side, creating an extensive structure (the Schaumbergbau) with three wings out of the old curtain wall, which was now closed to the exterior. This prestigious residential building shaped the appearance of the castle, together with the expansion of the late Renaissance, up to the 19th century, although weapons continued to be stored in the basement.

==== Gemmingenbau ====
After the short reign of Bishop Caspar von Seckendorff (1590–1595), Gemmingen added, among other things, a famous botanical garden, the Eichstätter Garten. The florilegium commissioned by the bishop describing the plants in this garden, the Hortus Eystettensis produced by the garden's curator, Basilius Besler in 1613 is considered one of the most important works of its type.

Also under Gemmingen, from 1609, the construction of a representative Renaissance castle based on the Italian model began. The old central building on the western spur was thus transformed. The Augsburg master builder Elias Holl provided the plans for this. (Note: A drawing from 1611, by Philipp Hainhofer shows the building under construction. Hainhofer wrote "Your Highness wishes to turn the entire palace round, and to have it built from blocks of rock on top of the cliff. It is intended to roof over one side even by this summer and to cover it all in copper. All together it will cost over 100,000 florins". The side that is referred to is the south wing, completed in 1611) The new south wing (1611) towered high over the mountainous crags. Together with Holl's Augsburg town hall, even in its reduced form, the palace is one of the most important works of the German Renaissance, described as "the perfect picture of one of the most beautiful princely residences in Germany at that time, as well as being an important fortress". Gemmingen's vision consisted of a lavishly furnished castle, with treasure vaults below decorated with illustrations of plants and figures bedecked with plants, which with the gardens created a summer residence in the Italian style, not known in Germany at that time.

With the death of Gemmingen in 1612, the cathedral chapter authorised his successor to continue the work. Bishop Johann Christoph von Westerstetten (1612-1636) arranged for completion of the new building (Gemmingenbau), which was still piecemeal, and initiated further conversions. The two-tower facade was created from 1629 with the participation of Hans Alberthal and his successor Martin Barbieri. The fortifications were reinforced by five modern bastions and the spacious outer bailey was created. The completed buildings can be seen in contemporary illustrations, such as those of Wolfgang Kilian (1628) and Matthäus Merian (1648). Kilian also provided some of the engravings for the Hortus Eystettensis.

During the Thirty Years' War (1618–1648), a Swedish army under the command of Bernhard von Sachsen-Weimar was able to take the castle fortress in the spring of 1633. At the end of October 1633, a Bavarian army under the command of Colonel Johann von Werth recaptured the fortress and successfully defended it, even though the Swedish army was in the immediate vicinity. Bernhard von Sachsen-Weimar had the Swedish fortress commander Anton Klaudius von Rasch executed on December 9, 1633 for prematurely abandoning the fortress in Regensburg. Bishop Marquard II Schenk von Castell (1636-1685) then ordered the repair of the damage and installed gun casemates in the bastions.

=== Modern history ===
In 1725, the bishop moved the residence to the new city palace (Residenz Eichstätt) by the cathedral. The Willibaldsburg became the seat of several offices and later a hospital and prison. After the Eichstätt Bishopric was secularized in 1806, the Bavarian State sold the facility to private owners. All usable furnishings were dispersed and a partial demolition reduced the building fabric.

In 1829, Bavaria repurchased the half-ruined buildings and made provisional repairs to the fortifications. During this time, the onion towers were demolished by a floor and a half and crenellated. The huge complex later served as barracks for the Bavarian Army (3. Königlich Bayerisches Jägerbataillon - 3rd Royal Bavarian Infantry Battalion).

The town of Eichstätt purchased the property in 1880, but it then reverted to the Bavarian State in 1900, who had owned the castle since 1880. In 1900, it was acquired by the Bavarian state and made a cultural monument and began measures to conserve the structure.

Between 1926 and 1934, the Congregation of Oblates of St. Francis de Sales occupied part of the Willibaldsburg, and from 1945 to 1955, the castle housed refugees from eastern regions of Germany including East Prussia, Silesia and Pomerania. In 1962, the Bavarian Administration of State-Owned Palaces, Gardens and Lakes took over the administration and extensive renovations were commenced. In 1976, the Jura Museum was opened in the Gemmingenbai and in 1980 the Museum of Prehistory and Early History was opened to the public. In 1998, the reconstructed bastion garden was inaugurated and after 2000, a circular path was created around the entire complex and the rubble removed in front of the two main bastions, so that the fortification concept can be fully experienced.

== Description ==
The modern Burgweg, approaches Willibaldsburg from the East, rising towards the outer bailey. There, the simple portal surmounted with a statue of St. Willibald is secured by two bastions from 1612, which guard the entrance with artillery. The drawbridge is long gone. The path from there leads through a 63 m gate hall to the inner castle courtyard. The barrel vault is 9 m high. In the north, the stables adjoin the gate building, followed by the single-storey wings of the former hospital and penitentiary with the rotunda of the penitentiary chapel. However, the eastern area of the outer bailey is not open to the public.

The spacious courtyard was created by demolitions in the 19th century and is now used as a parking lot. Only the remains of the Schaumbergbau in the north have survived from the former development. The Gothic Dirnitz, a five-bay, cross-vaulted courtyard room, whose square main hall rests on a round central pillar is here. Below the Dirnitz lies the two-aisled cellar with its barrel vault. Further cellar rooms are located under the courtyard area.

Otherwise, apart from the shield wall in front of the "Gemmingenbau", there is nothing left of the "Schaumbergbau" above ground, the main hall of which, according to the court chamber protocol of 1765, had twenty-nine windows and was spanned by a magnificent wooden ceiling. The other furnishings must also have been of great artistic importance, as the preserved Dirnitz shows.

Due to the demolition of the "Schaumbergbau", the impressive shield wall of the medieval castle is now visible. Formerly, two towers flanked the five meter thick defensive wall. Behind it are the three wings of the "Gemmingenbau". This so-called New Castle encloses a late Renaissance inner courtyard, which, however, could only be partially completed according to Holl's plans. For example, the north wing was to be moved north by two window axes. The portal of the west building is therefore on the north corner, the ground floor arcades of the south wing lack their northern counterparts. In addition, the upper floors in the south and west were demolished in 1826 after the roof had already been covered after secularisation.

Nevertheless, the monumental west building, with its two square corner towers and the bastion fortifications, is considered the city's landmark. From the outside, the "Gemmingenbau" appears to be four stories (formerly five stories), the towers protrude powerfully and are closed off by octagons with crenellated parapets, formed from half windows.

The western bastions were built under Marquard II Schenk von Castell (1637-1685) to replace older bastions. As early as 1658, the “Half Moon” bastion was placed in front of the western front as a ravelin or lunette.

== Usage ==
The castle houses the Jura Museum, a natural history museum. It possesses numerous fossils, including the famous Eichstätt Archaeopteryx. The museum is based on the extensive natural science collections of the Episcopal Seminary in Eichstätt and is managed by the General Directorate of the Staatliche Naturwissenschaftliche Sammlungen Bayerns (Bavarian State Natural Science Collection). There are regular special exhibitions, guided tours and lectures organized by the “Freunde des Jura-Museums Eichstätt e. V.” The museum was closed at the end of 2018 due to the uncertain financial situation. In July 2019, the Catholic University of Eichstätt took over the sponsorship, and the museum reopened in May 2020.

Also at Willibaldsburg is the Museum für Ur- und Frühgeschichte auf der Willibaldsburg (Museum of Prehistory and Early History) owned by the Eichstätt Historical Society. The museum displays the history of the region from the Stone Age to the early Middle Ages. The focus is on Ice Age animal skeletons of mammoths, reindeer and hyenas. There is also a section with extensive Roman archaeological finds and a model of the Roman fort in Pfünz with over 400 painted pewter figures. In the last room of the museum there is a late Merovingian tomb. Part of the castle is also used by the Bavarian State for archive purposes.

== Awards ==
The 1977 Bund Deutscher Architekten (BDA) Bayern architecture prize was awarded to Willibaldsburg for the construction of the Jura Museum.

== See also ==
- List of bishops of Eichstätt

== Bibliography ==
=== Books and articles ===
- Besler, Basilius (2016) [1613]. Littger, Klaus Walter; Dressendörfer, Werner (eds.). Florilegium: The Book of Plants-- the Complete Plates. Taschen. ISBN 978-3-8365-5787-0.
- Engerisser, Peter (2007). Von Kronach nach Nördlingen: der Dreissigjährige Krieg in Franken, Schwaben und der Oberpfalz 1631-1635 (in German). Weißenstadt: Verlag Späthling. ISBN 978-3-926621-32-0.
- Glaser, Sabine (2000) [1982 Manfred F. Fischer]. Die Willibaldsburg in Eichstätt: Amtlicher Führer [Official Guide] (in German) (Revised ed.). Bayer. Verw. der Staatl. Schlösser, Gärten und Seen. ISBN 978-3-932982-08-8.(Official site)
- Günther, Albert Josef (2003). Inventarisation der Wappen und Bauinschriften auf der Willibaldsburg [Inventory of the coat of arms and building inscriptions on the Willibaldsburg]. Sammelblatt des historischen Vereins Eichstätt (in German). Vol. 96. Eichstätt: Brönner. pp. 89–98.
- Hüttenbach, Oscar von Lochner von (1914). Die Willibaldsburg bei Eichstätt. Sammelblatt des historischen Vereins Eichstätt (in German). Vol. 27. Eichstätt: Brönner.
- Mader, Felix (1892–1972). "V. Regierungsbezirk Mittelfranken- I. Stadt Eichstätt 1924 [Administrative district of Middle Franconia - City of Eichstätt]". In Riehl, Berthold; Bezold, Gustav von (eds.). Die Kunstdenkmäler des Königreichs Bayern 112 vols [The art monuments of the Kingdom of Bavaria] (in German). Munich: Bayerisches Landesamt für Denkmalpflege.(see Die Kunstdenkmäler von Bayern)
- NSLB (1938). Die Willibaldsburg: 1 Von der vorgermanischen Fliehburg zum mittelalterlichen Fürstensitz [From the pre-Germanic refugee castle to the medieval princely seat]. Das schöne Franken (Beltz' Lesebogen) 6; Jugendschriftenstelle des NSLB, Gau Franken. Langensalza, Berlin, Leipzig: Julius Beltz.
- — (1938). Die Willibaldsburg: 3 Jahrhunderte des Niedergangs [Centuries of Decline]. Das schöne Franken (Beltz' Lesebogen) 8D; Jugendschriftenstelle des NSLB, Gau Franken. Langensalza, Berlin, Leipzig: Julius Beltz.
- Rauch, Alexander (1989). Stadt Eichstätt. Denkmäler in Bayern, Vol. 9/1. Munich: Schnell & Steiner. ISBN 3-7954-1004-5.
- Häutle, Christian (1881). "Die Reisen des Augsburger Philipp Hainhofer nach Eichstädt, München und Regensburg in den Jahren 1611, 1612 und 1613". Zeitschrift des Historischen Vereins für Schwaben und Neuburg (in German). 8: 1–316.

=== Websites ===
- "Gesichte". Oblaten des hl. Franz von Sales - Salesianum Rosental (in German).
- BL (2022). "Hortus Eystettensis". Collection items. British Library. Archived from the original on 27 October 2020.
- Chloupek, Eva (28 December 2018). "Ein (vorerst) letzter Besuch: Jura-Museum schließt am Sonntag - Regens Wohner: "Das war nie unser Anliegen"". Donau Kurier: Eichstatt (in German).
- Naturpark. "Willibaldsburg Castle". Naturpark Altmühltal. Frankentourismus.
- Stadt Eichstätt (2022). "Willibaldsburg". Eichstätt: Die vielschichtige Altmühlstadt - Urlaub: Sehenswuerdigkeiten (in German).
- "Willibaldsburg Castle – Eichstätt". Palaces. Bayerische Verwaltung der staatlichen Schlösser, Gärten und Seen. 2022.
- HVE (2022). "Die Geschichte der Willibaldsburg in Eichstätt". www.histver.de. Historischer Verein Eichstätt.
