= Magdalena Fürstin =

German artist (1652–1717)

- Born: 1652; Nuremberg, Germany
- Died: 1717 (aged 64–65)
- Known for: botanical illustration

Magdalena Fürstin (1652–1717) was a German artist and hand-colourist. She was from Nuremberg, and was a pupil of John Fischer and Maria Sybilla Merian.

== Life ==
She was born into a middle class family and was the youngest of three daughters that they had. Her father was in the business of buying and selling art works.

== Legacy ==
Her name appears as a plate illuminator in Basilius Besler's famous codex of the plant specimens in the Garden of Eichstatt, Hortus Eystettensis: Studien zur Entstehung des Kupferstichwerks und zum Exemplar des Andrea Vendramin (or Hortus Eystettensis: Studies on the creation of the copper engraving and the copy of Andrea Vendramin) She worked on the book for five years, and the copy she worked on is currently in the Austrian National Library in Vienna.
