= Oflag VII-B =

World War II German prisoner-of-war camp

- Eichstätt, Bavaria

Site information
- Type: Prisoner-of-war camp
- Controlled by: Nazi Germany

Location
- Eichstätt, Germany (pre-war borders, 1937)
- Location within Germany
- Coordinates: 48.88306°N 11.20720°E

Site history
- In use: 1939–1945

Garrison information
- Occupants: Polish, then British and Commonwealth officers

Oflag VII-B was a World War II German prisoner-of-war camp for officers (Offizierlager), located in Eichstätt, Bavaria, about 100 km (62 mi) north of Munich.

== Camp history ==
The camp was built in September 1939 to house Polish prisoners from the German invasion of Poland. The first prisoners arrived there on 18 October 1939.

On 22 May 1940 all 1,336 Polish prisoners were transferred to Oflag VII-A Murnau, and were replaced with British, French and Belgian officers taken prisoner during the battle of France and Belgium.

In the summer of 1941 Australians and New Zealanders captured in Greece and Crete during the Balkans Campaign arrived in the camp.

In Rommel's second offensive on Tobruk in June 1942, most of the South African 2nd Division was captured. Many of these soldiers were interned at Oflag VII-B.

On 31 August 1942 Canadian officers captured during the Dieppe Raid arrived. Soon after their arrival the senior Canadian officer, Brigadier W.W. Southam, convened a conference which compiled an after action report on the Raid. This was recorded in shorthand in a notebook labelled "Shorthand Reading Exercises. O. Henry's Short Stories", which after the war was donated to the archives of the Historical Section of the Canadian Army HQ.

In September 1942, British officers from Oflag VI-B Dössel, were transferred to VII-B after a mass escape (the "Warburg Wire Job"). Within months two officers from Dössel, Lieutenant Jock Hamilton-Baillie and Captain Frank Weldon, proposed digging a tunnel north from Block 2's latrine to a villager's chicken coop about 30 m (98 ft) away. Work began in December 1942, but the rocky ground made digging difficult. The Germans found spoil from the tunnel and searched the camp, but failed to find it. The tunnel was completed in May, and on the night of 3/4 June 1943 sixty-five men escaped. Most of them headed south, towards Switzerland, sleeping by day and travelling by night. Eventually, all 65 were recaptured, but had occupied over 50,000 police, soldiers, home guard and Hitler Youth for a week. After two weeks detention in nearby Willibaldsburg Castle, the escapees were sent to Oflag IV-C at Colditz Castle.

In spring of 1943 American and British (C company) personnel captured in the Tunisia Campaign arrived.

A. N. L. Munby, the librarian and author, wrote and published some of his short stories while a prisoner at the camp.

On 14 April 1945, as the U.S. Army approached, the officers were marched out of the camp. A short distance from the camp the column was attacked by American aircraft, who mistook it for a formation of German troops. Fourteen British officers were killed and 46 were wounded. In 2003 a memorial plaque was erected by local German authorities at the site.

The camp was liberated by the U.S. Army on 16 April 1945. The POWs were repatriated to their home countries. For the British this meant a march begging for food from farmers until transport reached them.

As of 2012 the site of the camp is occupied by the barracks and training school of II. Bereitschaftspolizeiabteilung ("2nd Riot Police Division") of the Bavarian State Police.

English composer Benjamin Britten wrote a short piece for male voices The Ballad of Little Musgrave and Lady Barnard and dedicated it to "Richard Wood and the musicians of Oflag VIIb". The work was completed on 13 December 1943 and smuggled into the camp on microfilm for the prisoners to sing.

== See also ==
- Oflag
- German prisoner-of-war camps in World War II
- Post-Mortem
