= Johann Konrad von Gemmingen =

Roman Catholic bishop

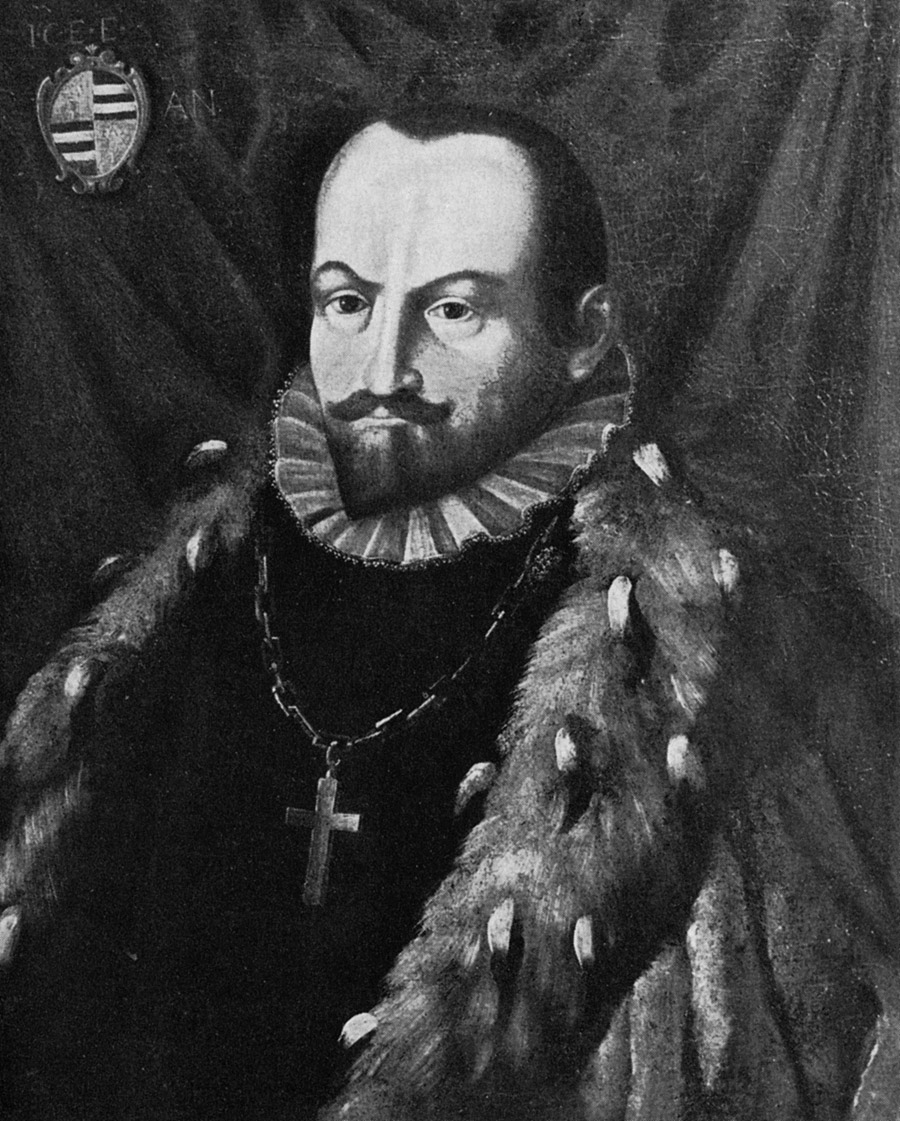
- Portrait of Johann Konrad von Gemmingen
- Diocese: Eichstätt
- Installed: 2 April 1595
- Term ended: 8 November 1612
- Predecessor: Kaspar von Seckendorff
- Successor: Johann Christoph von Westerstetten

Orders
- Ordination: 10 May 1592
- Consecration: by Lorenz Eiszepf

Personal details
- Born: 23 October 1561 Tiefenbronn
- Died: 8 November 1612 (aged 51) Eichstätt
- Denomination: Roman Catholic

Johann Konrad von Gemmingen (also Conrad) (23 October 1561 − 8 November 1612) was Prince bishop of Roman Catholic Diocese of Eichstätt in Bavaria. The bishop was an enthusiastic botanist who derived great pleasure from his garden, which rivaled Hortus Botanicus Leiden among early European botanical gardens outside Italy.

== Family of origin ==

Johann Konrad came from the Steinegg line of the Swabian noble family of the Lords of Gemmingen and was the third of eight children of Dietrich IX von Gemmingen (1517–1586) an Augsburg councilor and governor of Dillingen and his wife Lia (also Leia), née von Schellenberg. He is thought to have been born in Tiefenbronn and to have at least partly grown up there. His uncle, the Augsburg Prince-Bishop Otto von Gemmingen, is said to have had a significant influence on his upbringing and repeatedly appears as his mentor.

== Education and career ==
Johann Konrad's career was typical of an ecclesiastical one of the times. In 1573, he became an Exspektanz (entitlement to a vacant position in the church) at Konstanz and a canon at Ellwangen in 1578. The following year he became a canon at the cathedral in Augsburg and a domiciliary in the diocese of Eichstätt, and he was also made a canon at Konstanz in 1588.

In 1579, he began his higher education, studying theology and then law at the University of Freiburg in 1583 at the University of Dillingen, 1584 at the University of Lorraine in Pont-à-Mousson, 1587 at the University of Paris, 1588 at the University of Siena, 1588 to 1589 at the University of Perugia, and 1589 at the University of Bologna. In addition to Latin, he mastered Italian and French. Educational trips also took him to several other countries, including England.

Johann Konrad's uncle then brought him to Augsburg in 1591 as cathedral dean, and he also received a full cathedral canonship in Eichstätt. He was ordained a priest on 10 May 1592, and in 1593 he became Coadjutor Bishop of Eichstätt, with the right of succession to the bishopric. In 1594, Pope Clement VIII appointed him titular bishop of Hierapolis in Isauria and Emperor Rudolf II bestowed the regalia on him.

== Bishop of Eichstätt ==
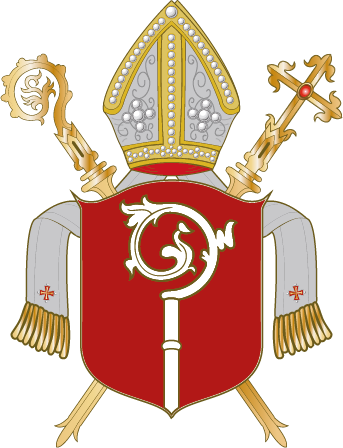

On 17 September 1594, Johann Konrad von Gemmingen assumed control of the Bishopric of Eichstätt while at the same time vacating his Augsburg Cathedral Deanery. On the death of the reigning bishop, Kaspar von Seckendorff on 2 April 1595 he assumed the full bishopric and was consecrated on 2 July 1595. His uncle had previously been elected to the position in 1590, but had declined the offer, preferring to stay in Augsburg, where he became bishop in 1591.

In the exercise of his spiritual duties, he ordered his Vicar General, Dr. Vitus Priefer to conduct a canonical visitation of the parishes, monasteries and monasteries within his Hochstift. He took good care of his seminary, the Collegium Willibaldinum, although this diminished over the years. He improved the general diocesan administration and expelled the last Lutheran from Eichstätt.

Bishop von Gemmingen was both a pragmatic politician and successful financier. He decided not to align his bishopric with the Catholic League, out of respect for his Protestant neighbours. He was an important patron of the arts, known for his extensive art collection and a truly princely interior at his castle. It has been said that Queen Elizabeth I of England had presented him with a quantity of diamonds, following a time as a page at her court. He was also princely in his ceremonies. On New Year's Day 1603, a six-horse jubilee carriage and another six carriages with a total of 91 people and 83 horses entered Ingolstadt, where 18 nobles studying at the university there served him in the church and provided him with an escort.

On 23 July 1611, he received a ceremonial monstrance he had commissioned, in the form of a vine with 66 bunches of grapes, from which emanated a star of diamonds. This required 1400 pearls, 350 diamonds, 250 rubies and other precious stones. At the time, its value was estimated at 150,000 guilders. (Note: For comparison, a carpenter earned 8 guilders a month at the time and a magnificent town house cost 2,500 guilders) The monstrance was destroyed in the secularization of 1806 and the gold and the pearls became part of the Bavarian Crown Jewels.

However, he was ruthless in dealing with supposed witchcraft in his Hochstift. Under his administration, witches were persecuted and between 1603 and 1606 at least 20 women from Eichstätt, Enkering, Landershofen, Dollnstein and Eitensheim were sentenced to death and executed.

== Willibaldsburg Castle and the Eichstätter Garten ==
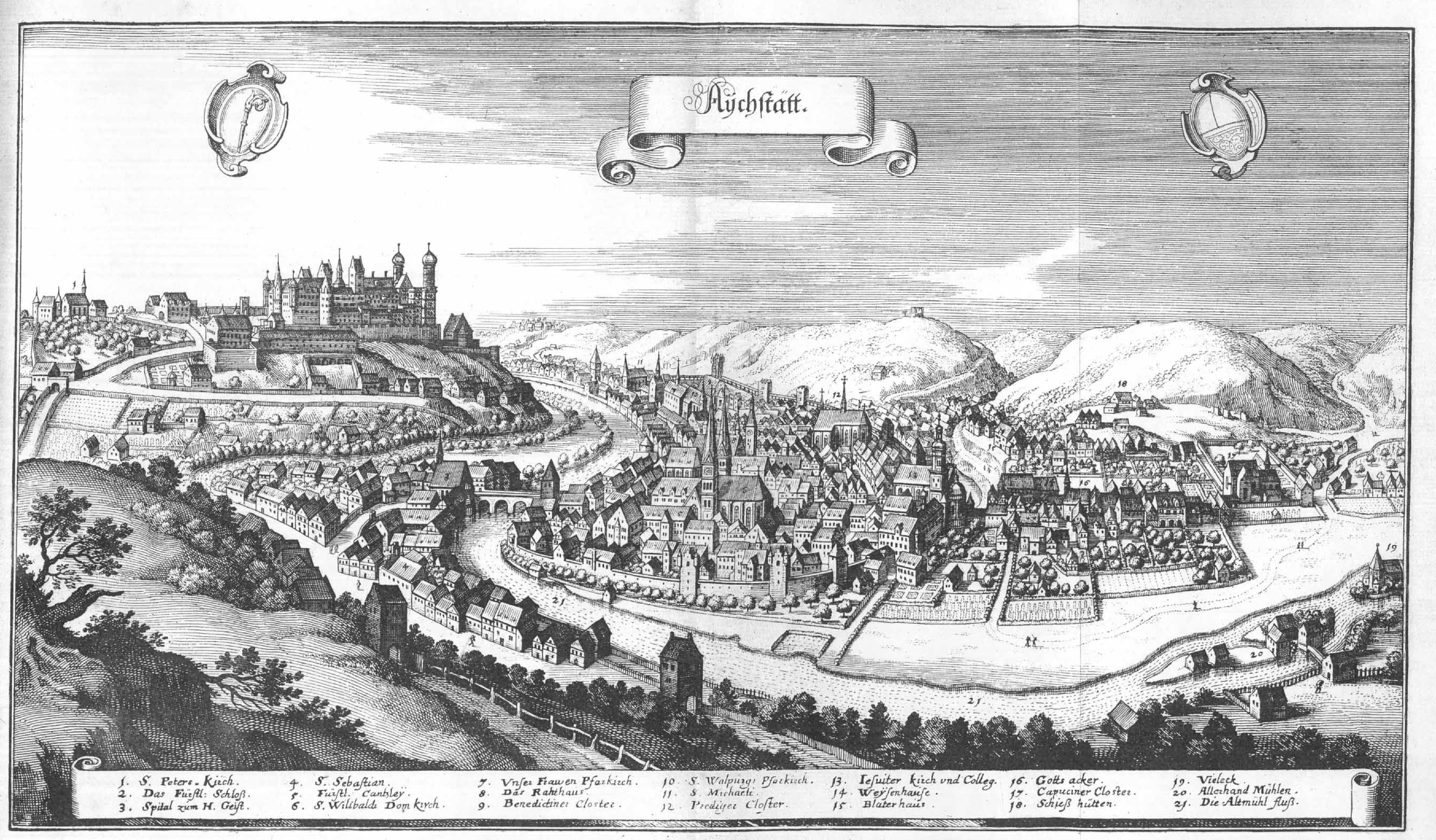
Engraving of Eichstätt and Willibaldsburg by Merian 1656

He was lavish with his enhancement of the bishop's residence, Willibaldsburg, in Eichstätt. On 14 May 1609 he personally carried out the laying of the foundation stone of the north tower of the residence, facing the convent of Mariastein, and turned the castle residence into a representative, albeit unfinished, princely seat in the Renaissance style, known as the Gemmingenbau, according to plans by the Augsburg master builder Elias Holl. Four years earlier he had had a Prince-Bishop's hunting lodge built opposite the castle.

In modern times, the bishop is known mainly for the Eichstätt Garden (Eichstätter Garten or Hortus Eystettensis) that he commissioned, which was laid out over eight terraces, facing the castle hill towards the city. Initially the work of Joachim Camerarius the Younger, and following his death in 1597, the apothecary Basilius Besler.

Subsequently, he arranged for the many plants, some of which were very rare, to be described and illustrated in a magnificent tome, the Hortus Eystettensis. He invested almost 20,000 guilders in this project, which resulted in a work of art that is still famous and coveted today as the most modern and most comprehensive plant book (florilegium) of all time. He did not live to see the first printing of the work in 1613, the year after his death.

== Last illness and death ==
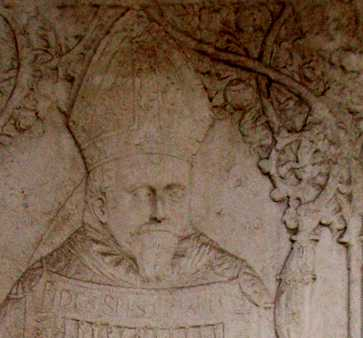
Tomb of Bishop v Gemmingen

From the spring of 1611, he became increasingly unwell, needing to be pushed in a wheelchair and towards the end of his life could no longer walk a single step. He died on either 7 or 8 November 1612 in excruciating pain. He was buried in the cathedral at Eichstätt.

The family chronicle of the Lords of Gemmingen describes the tomb as follows: His corpse covers the most beautiful monument among the bishops of Eichstädt, which Christoph v. Westerstetten set. Eichstaedt's golden age sank into this grave for more than a century. The aforementioned bronze/marble epitaph in the east chancel of the cathedral was created by the sculptor Hans Krumpper from Munich. His tombstone is now in the cloister of Eichstätt Cathedral.

== See also ==
- List of bishops of Eichstätt

== Bibliography ==
- Besler, Basilius (2016) [1613]. Littger, Klaus Walter; Dressendörfer, Werner (eds.). Florilegium: The Book of Plants-- the Complete Plates. Taschen. ISBN 978-3-8365-5787-0.
- Gatz, Erwin; Brodkorb, Clemens, eds. (1996). Die Bischöfe des Heiligen Römischen Reiches, 1448 bis 1648: ein biographisches Lexikon (in German). Duncker & Humblot. pp. 215–219. ISBN 978-3-428-08422-7.
- Reithmeier, Irene (2010). Johann Konrad von Gemmingen: Fürstbischof von Eichstätt (1593/95 - 1612); Landesherr und Diözesanvorstand im Späthumanismus. Deutsche Digitale Bibliothek (Thesis, LMU Munich) (in German). Regensburg: Pustet. ISBN 978-3-7917-2262-7.
  - Appl, Tobias (1 January 2011). "Johann Konrad von Gemmingen: Fürstbischof von Eichstätt". Zeitschrift für bayerische Landesgeschichte (Review) (in German). 74 (3): 935–939.
  - Bukl, Walter (27 April 2010). "Das Leben eines geistlichen Reichsfürsten". Donau Kurier: Eichstatt (Review) (in German).
- Stocker, Carl W. F. L. (1895). "Johan Conrad". Familien-Chronik der Freiherren von Gemmingen (in German). CWFL Stocker. pp. 322–330.
- AD (2022). "Basilius Besler 1591–1629". Art Directory: Literature- Biographies.
- Cheney, David M (2020). "Bishop Johann Konrad von Gemmingen [Catholic-Hierarchy]". Catholic Hierarchy.

Catholic Church titles
Preceded by Kaspar von Seckendorff	Bishop of Eichstätt; 1612–1637	Succeeded by Johann Christoph von Westerstetten
