= Jura Museum =

Natural History Museum

Coordinates: 48°53′42″N 11°10′07″E

The Jura Museum, a museum located in Willibaldsburg castle in the town of Eichstätt, Germany, is a natural history museum that has an extensive exhibit of Jurassic fossils from the quarries of Solnhofen and surroundings, including marine reptiles, pterosaurs, and one specimen of the early bird Archaeopteryx. The latest acquisition of the museum is the well preserved skeleton of the coelurosaur Juravenator.

The museum also has an aquarium, with several large tanks showing tropical fish and corals, as well as Nautilus..
