= Johann Christoph von Westerstetten =

German bishop (1563–1637)

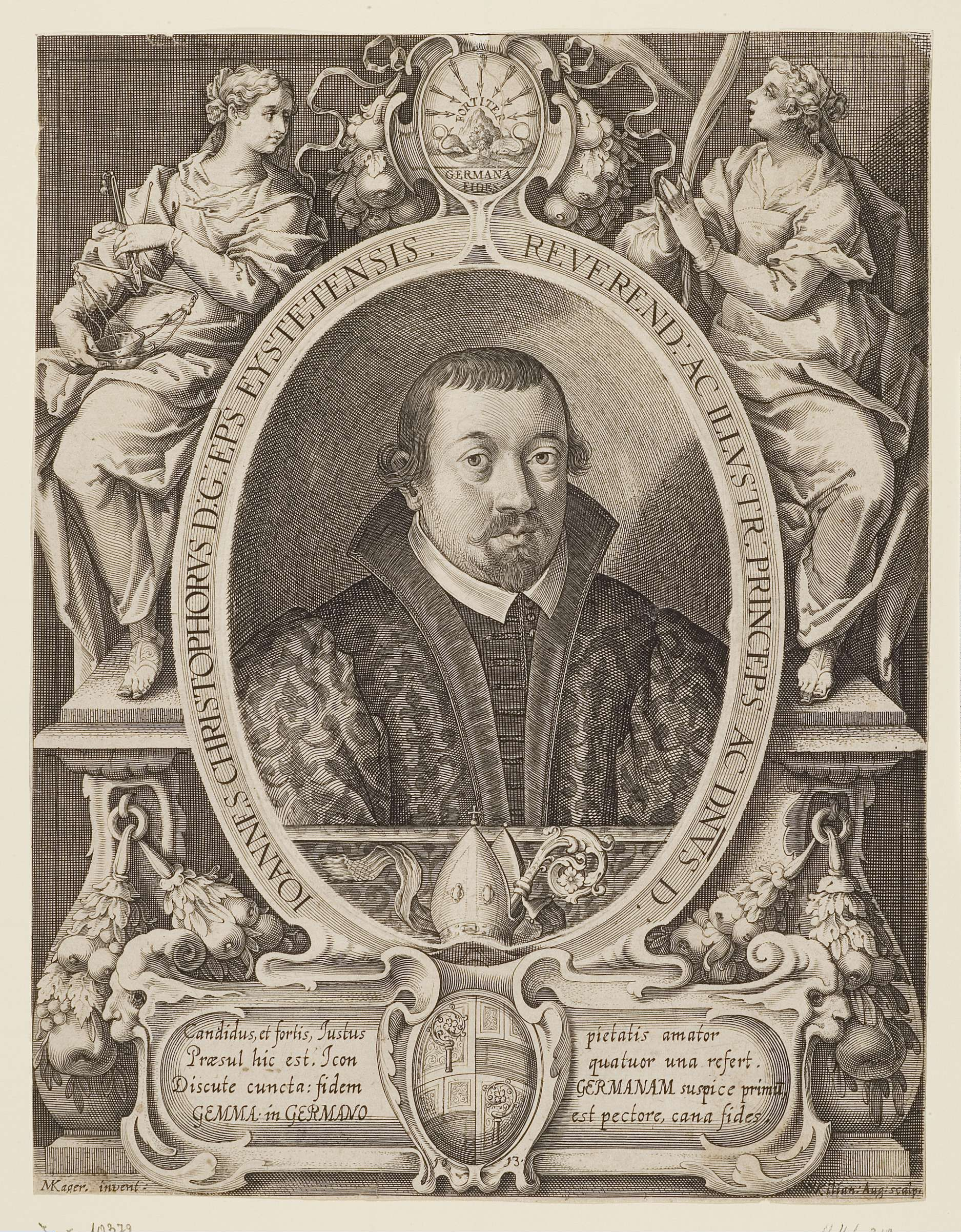
- Portrait of Johann Christoph von Westerstetten in 1613
- Diocese: Eichstätt
- Installed: 28 January 1613
- Term ended: 28 July 1637
- Predecessor: Johann Konrad von Gemmingen
- Successor: Marquard II. Schenk von Castell

Orders
- Consecration: 14 April 1613 by Heinrich von Knöringen

Personal details
- Born: 6 January 1562 Wasseralfingen
- Died: 28 July 1637 (aged 75)

Johann Christoph von Westerstetten (6 January 1563 - 28 July 1637) was Prince-bishop of Eichstätt, Bavaria, Germany, during the Thirty Years' War. He was a proponent of the Counter-Reformation.

Von Westerstetten was born on 6 January 1563 at Wasseralfingen. He was ordained a Catholic priest in Augsburg, Bavaria, on 11 August 1589. In 1603 he became provost in Ellwangen. On 4 December 1612 he was selected Prince-bishop of Eichstätt. He was confirmed on 28 January 1613 and consecrated on 14 April 1613. He is well-known for the large number of witch trails conducted during his authority.

In Ellwangen, he began systematically persecuting witches and continued the witch-hunt in Eichstätt. In 1611 and 1612 about 260 witches were executed in Ellwangen. The bulk of the Eichstätt witch trials occurred under his government; between 1613 and 1630 at least 199 witch trials and 176 executions (150 women and 26 men) were performed in the Prince-Bishopric of Eichstätt.

In 1630, King Gustavus Adolphus of Sweden landed in Germany and threatened to invade Bavaria. In 1631, Westerstetten came to the Jesuit College of Ingolstadt, perhaps seeking the protection of Duke Maximilian. His reason may equally have been that he was bishop of that town, and president of the University of Ingolstadt. He never returned to Eichstätt and died on 28 July 1637, aged 75.
