= Basilius Besler =

German botanist (1561–1629)

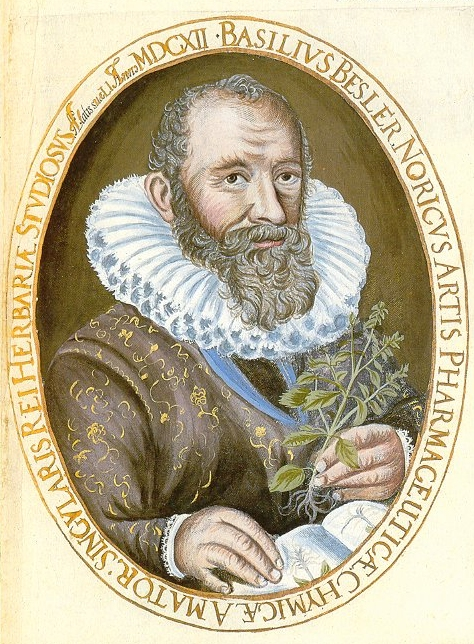
- Basilius Besler c.1613
- Born: February 13, 1561; Nuremberg
- Died: March 13, 1629 (aged 68); Nuremberg
- Citizenship: German
- Known for: First major Florilegium
- Scientific career
- Fields: Apothecary, Botany
- Institutions: Eichstätt
- Author abbrev. (botany): Besler

Basilius Besler (1561–1629) was a respected Nuremberg apothecary and botanist, best known for his monumental florilegium, the Hortus Eystettensis (lit. The Garden at Eichstätt), 1613.

== Biography ==
Besler was born in Nuremberg, Holy Roman Empire on February 13 1561, the son of Michael Besler. His first wife was Rosine Flock, who he married on 31 January 1585. Later he married Susanne Schmidt on 1 December 1596. Altogether he had 16 children. He was elected a member of the city council in 1594.

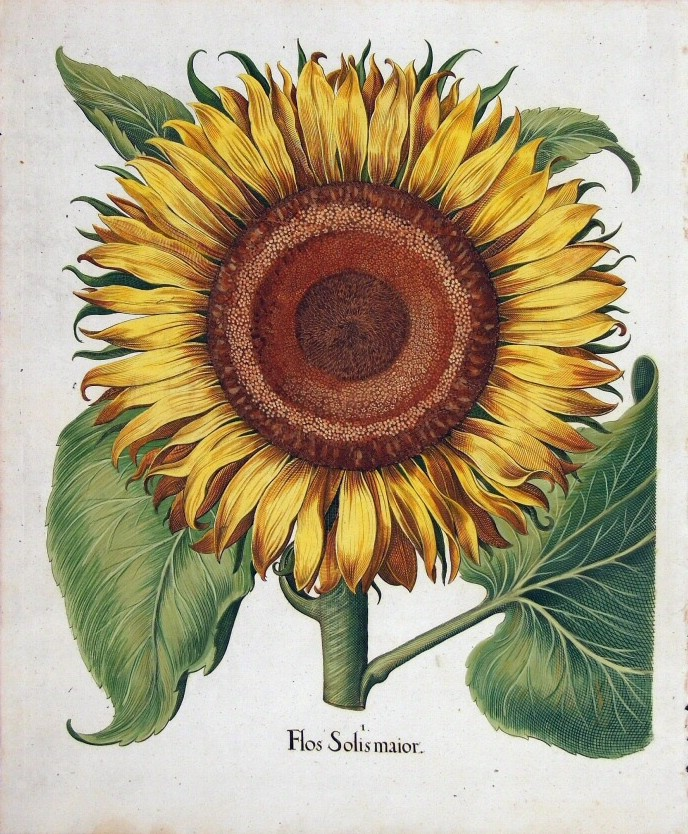
Sunflower from Hortus Eystettensis

Besler established a pharmacy, Zum Marienbild, at Nuremberg's Hay Market in 1589, and developed his own botanical garden and collection of specimens, for which he became well known.

He was curator of the garden (Eichstätt Garden) of Johann Konrad von Gemmingen (1561–1612), Prince-bishop of Eichstätt in Bavaria. The bishop was an enthusiastic botanist who derived great pleasure from his garden, which rivaled Hortus Botanicus Leiden among early European botanical gardens outside Italy.

The gardens surrounded the bishop's palace, Willibaldsburg, which was built on a hill overlooking the town. These gardens had been started in 1596 and designed by Besler's colleague, Joachim Camerarius the Younger (1534–1598), a physician and botanist. Upon Camerarius' death in 1598, Besler had the remainder of Camerarius' plants moved to Eichstätt and carried on the work of planting and supervision.

The gardens were ransacked by invading Swedish troops under Herzog Bernhard von Weimar in 1633-4, but were reconstructed and opened to the public of Eichstätt in 1998.

Besler died in Nuremberg on 13 March 1629.

== Work ==
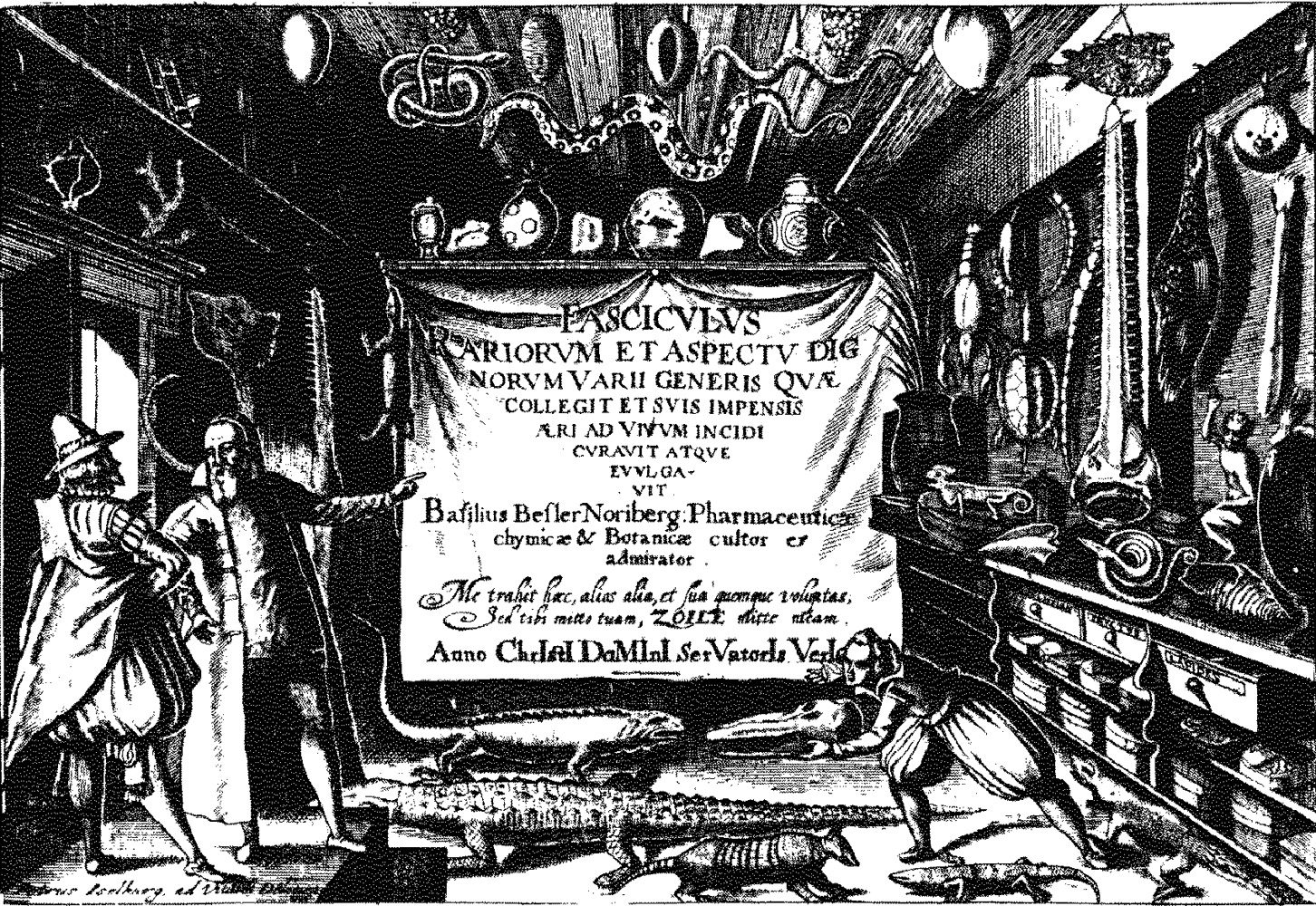
Fascicvlvs Rariorvm title page (1616)

In 1611, the bishop, who was already quite ill, commissioned Besler to compile a codex of the plants growing in his garden, a task which Besler took sixteen years to complete, the bishop dying shortly before the work was published in 1613. Plates were not signed at the bottom and in some the names of the artist are hidden away in the illustration. These include those of Kilian, J. Leypolt, or the initials G.R., G.H., D.K., and F.H. The names used for the plants were polynomials. This plant atlas or Florilegium was published by Ludwig Jungermann and printed in large format.

Besler did not consider himself a scientist, but rather relied on the extant literature of his time including Camerarius, Clusius, Fuchs, Tabernaemontanus and Lobelius, but his work predated the introduction of many overseas plants to Germany. He indexed the collection with both the Latin and old German names. At publication it represented the largest and most magnificent example of its type.

== Legacy ==
Besler was commemorated by Plumier in naming a genus of shrubs Besleria.

== Bibliography ==
=== Books ===
- Debus, Allen G, ed. (1968). "Besler, Basilius". World Who's who in Science: A Biographical Dictionary of Notable Scientists from Antiquity to the Present. Marquis Who's Who, Incorporated. p. 168. ISBN 978-0-8379-1001-7.
- BL (2014). The Garden of Eichstatt. British Library. Archived from the original on 2021-10-26.
- Barker, Nicolas (1994). Hortus Eystettensis: The Bishop's Garden and Besler's Magnificent Book. H.N. Abrams. ISBN 978-0-8109-3424-5.
- Besler, Basilius (2016) [1613]. Littger, Klaus Walter; Dressendörfer, Werner (eds.). Florilegium: The Book of Plants-- the Complete Plates. Taschen. ISBN 978-3-8365-5787-0.

=== Websites ===
- AD (2022). "Basilius Besler 1591–1629". Art Directory: Literature- Biographies.
- BL (2022). "Hortus Eystettensis". Collection items. British Library. Archived from the original on 27 October 2020.
