= Loy Hering =

German Renaissance sculptor

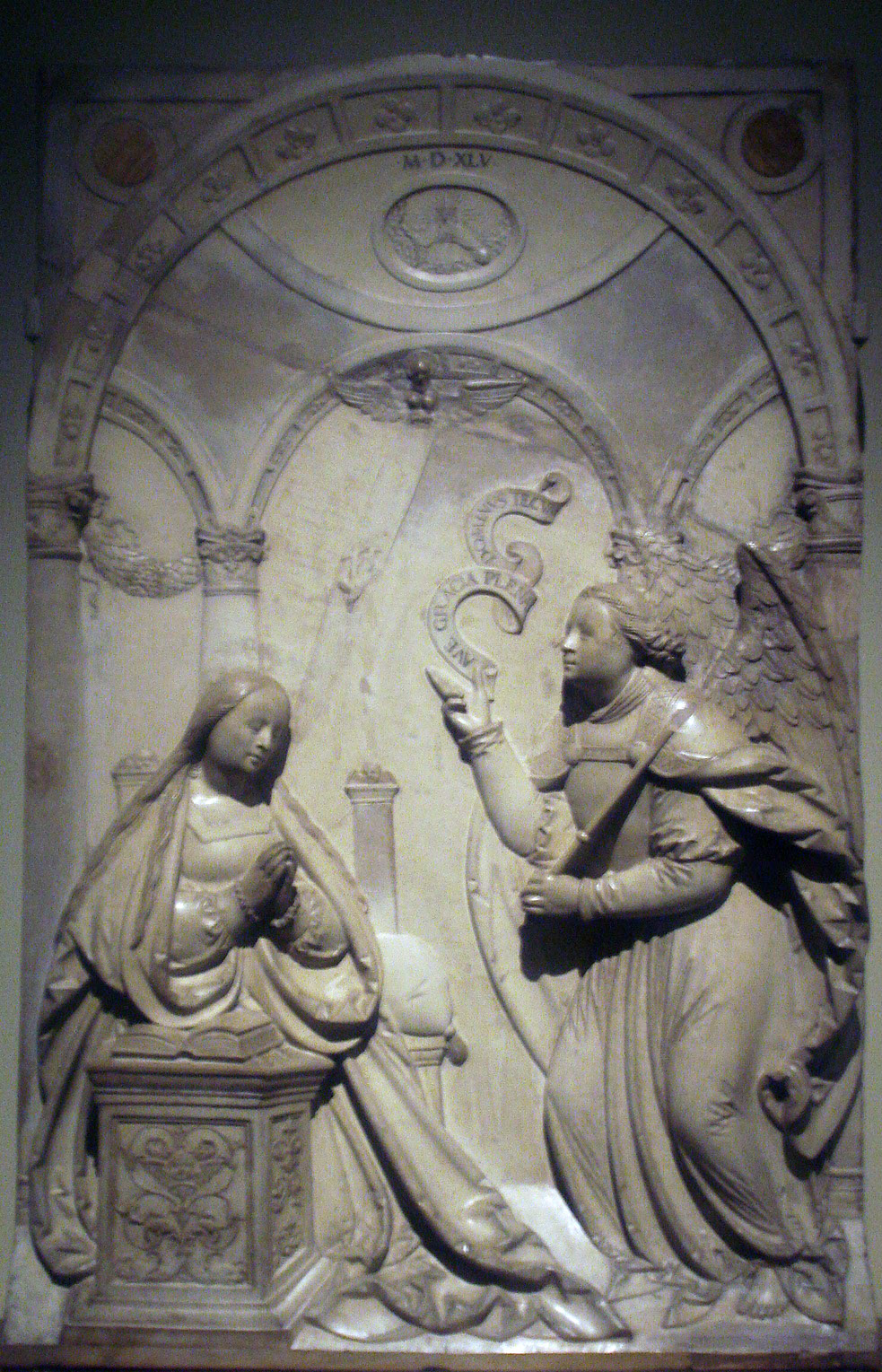
Annunciation, 1545. In the collection of the Taft Museum of Art

Loy Hering (1484–85 in Kaufbeuren – 1 June 1564 in Eichstätt) was a German Renaissance sculptor.

He began his career as an apprentice to Hans Beierlein in Augsburg. Between 1511 and 1512 he settled in Eichstätt, where in 1519 he was elected to the city council, from which he was elected to the post of Mayor several times (1523–24, 1527, 1533 and 1540). His greatest patron was the Prince-Bishop Gabriel von Eyb. With his sons and apprentices Hering ran one of the most prolific artist's workshops of the German renaissance, supplying sculptures to almost the entire German-speaking region.
