= Sebastian Schedel =

German painter and illustrator (1570–1628)

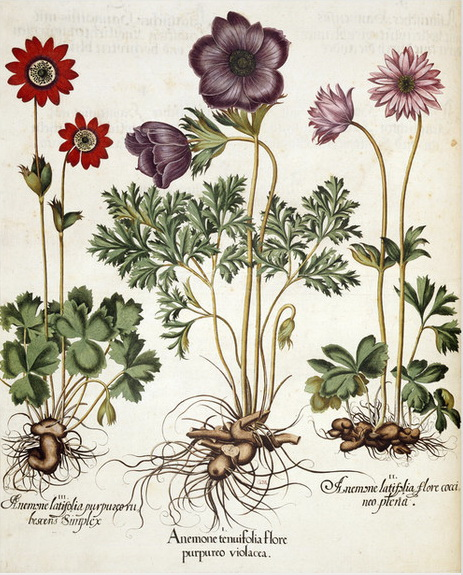
Plate from Hortus Eystettensis (1613)

Sebastian Schedel (1570–1628) was a German painter and illustrator best known for his contributions to the Hortus Eystettensis. A few of the original drawings for the Hortus Eystettensis are preserved at Kew in a codex called Schedel’s Calendarium.

== Family Schedel ==
The name Schedel was a respected one in Germany in the 15th century. Sebastian was the great-grandson of Hartmann Schedel (1440-1514), German historian, physician, humanist, and one of the first cartographers to make use of the printing press. He was also the grandson of Sebastian Schedel (1494 Nuremberg - 1541 Hersbruck) and Barbara Pfinzing (1492 Nuremberg - 1528 Nuremberg), and son of Melchior Schedel (1516 Nuremberg - 1571 Nuremberg). Melchior was little interested in his grandfather's library, and ignored his express will that the books be kept together. He sold the library for 500 guilders in 1552 to the Augsburg merchant Johann Jakob Fugger (1516–1575). Fugger, in need of money, sold it two decades later to the Bavarian Duke Albrecht V.

In 1552, Schedel's grandson, Melchior Schedel, sold about 370 manuscripts and 600 printed works from Hartmann Schedel's library to Johann Jakob Fugger. Fugger later sold his library to Duke Albert V of Bavaria in 1571. This library, one of the largest formed by an individual in the 15th century, is now mostly preserved in the Bayerische Staasbibliothek in Munich. Among the surviving portions of Schedel's library are the records for the publication of the work, including Schedel's contract with Koberger for the publication of the work and the financing of the work by Sebald Schreyer and Sebastian Kammermeister, as well as the contracts with Wohlgemut and Pleydenwurff for the original artworks and engravings. The collection also includes the original manuscript copies of the work in Latin and German.

— https://www.swaen.com/Chronicle.php
