= Tobias Barnerssoi =

German alpine skier (born 1969)

Tobias Barnerssoi (born 19 June 1969 in Eichstätt) is a German retired alpine skier who competed in the 1994 Winter Olympics.
