= Prince-Bishopric of Eichstätt =

Ecclesiastical principality of the Holy Roman Empire

Prince-Bishopric of Eichstätt Hochstift Eichstätt
- 1305–1802
- Coat of arms

- Prince-Bishopric of Eichstätt, J.B. Homann, c.1717
- Status: Prince-Bishopric
- Capital: Eichstätt
- Common languages: Central Bavarian
- Government: Ecclesiastical principality
- Historical era: Middle Ages
  - Diocese established: 741
  - Prince-Bishopric: 1305
  - Joined Franconian Circle: 1500
  - Joined Catholic League: 1617
  - Mediatised to Salzburg: 1802
Preceded by	Succeeded by
Duchy of Bavaria / Duchy of Bavaria	Kingdom of Bavaria / Kingdom of Bavaria

The Prince-Bishopric of Eichstätt (German: Hochstift Eichstätt, Fürstbistum Eichstätt, Bistum Eichstätt) was a small ecclesiastical principality of the Holy Roman Empire. Centered on the town of Eichstätt, it was located in the present-day state of Bavaria, somewhat to the west of Regensburg, to the north of Neuburg an der Donau and Ingolstadt, to the south of Nuremberg, and to the southeast of Ansbach.

== Geography ==
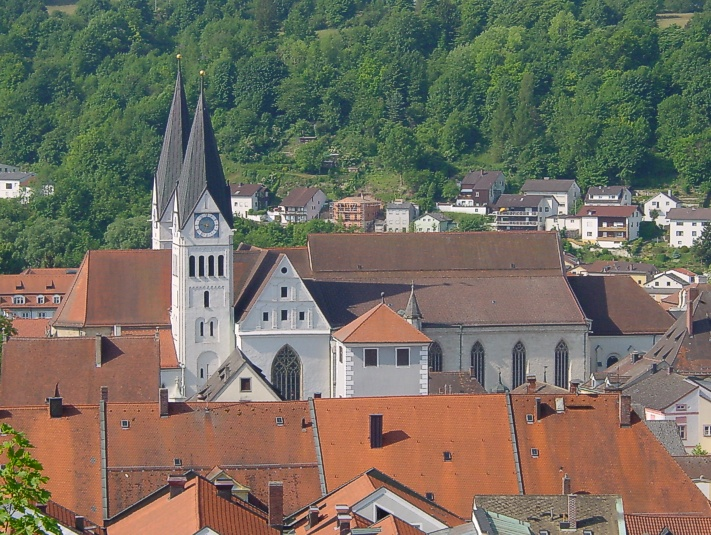
Eichstätt Cathedral, founded by the first bishop Willibald in 741

Geographically, the territory of the Prince-Bishopric was very fragmented and, as of 1789, consisted of one main part to the east that was bordered by Bavaria in the north, east, and south, and by Pappenheim and Brandenburg-Ansbach in the west. The rest of the principality was located to the west and consisted of several fragments of various sizes enclaved mostly within Brandenburg-Ansbach. The total area was about 1100 km^{2}, with a population of 58,000 (as of 1855).

== History ==
The Diocese of Eichstätt was established in 746, when the Anglo-Saxon missionary Willibald was consecrated to the episcopate by Saint Boniface and turned to the church of Eichstätt in the German stem duchy of Bavaria. His successors achieved the status of a Prince-Bishop, when they inherited the Franconian territories of their former Vogt officials, the extinct Counts of Hirschberg (at Hirschberg Castle in the present-day town of Beilngries). In reaction to the Protestant Reformation, Eichstätt joined the Catholic League in 1617. The lands of the bishopric were a centre of the Counter-Reformation and the site of numerous witchcraft trials.

In the course of the 1802 German mediatization following the French Revolutionary Wars, the bishopric was secularized and was in 1803, along with the Archbishopric of Salzburg, given in compensation to Archduke Ferdinand of Habsburg-Lorraine, brother of Emperor Francis II, new Elector of Salzburg and former Grand Duke of Tuscany. Three years later, following Austria's defeat by Napoleon at the Battle of Austerlitz, the area was given to the Kingdom of Bavaria according to the Treaty of Pressburg. From 1817 to 1855, the Principality of Eichstätt was recreated as a fief of Bavaria for the benefit of Napoleon's stepson Eugène de Beauharnais.

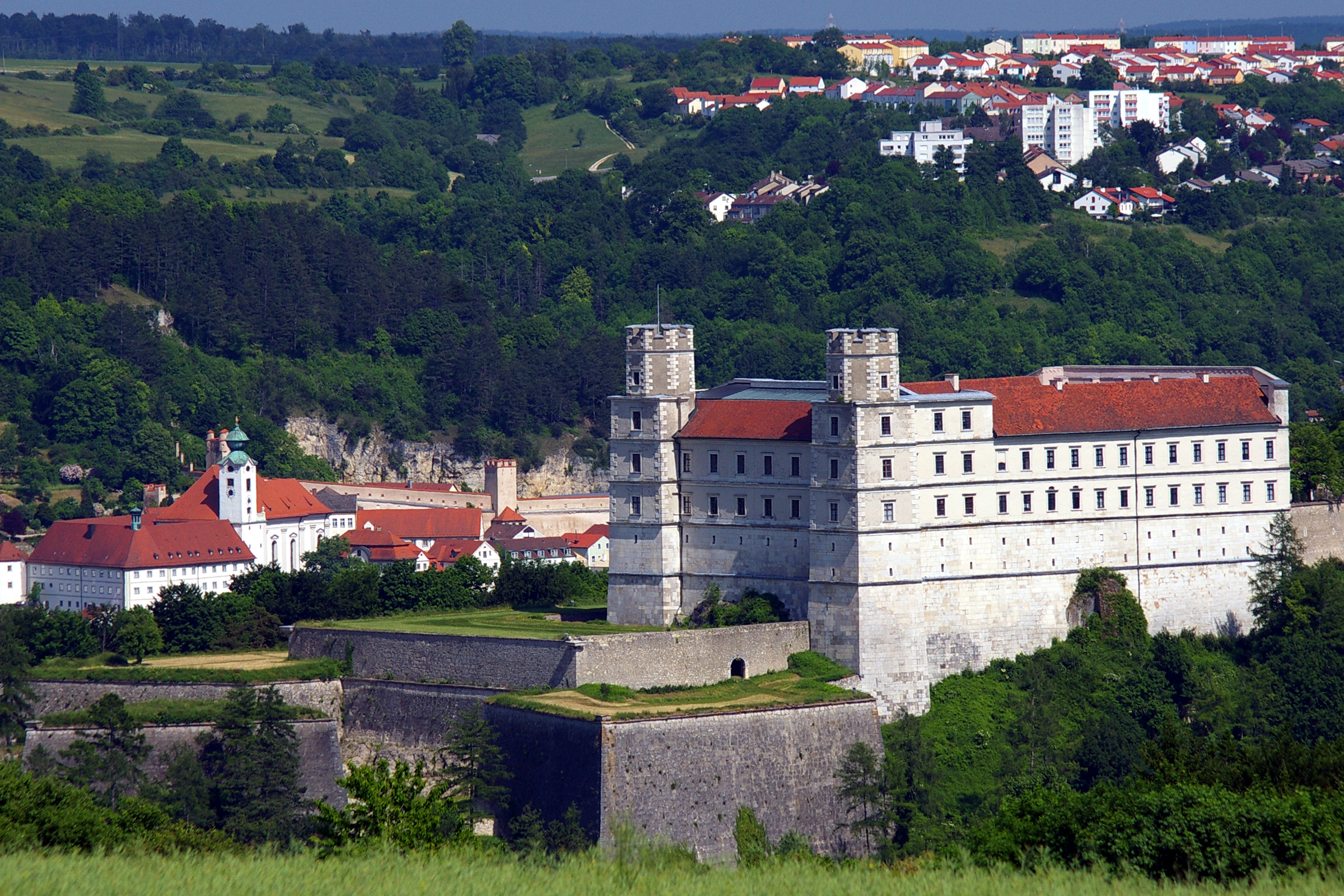
Willibaldsburg, residence of the prince-bishops from 1360 until 1725

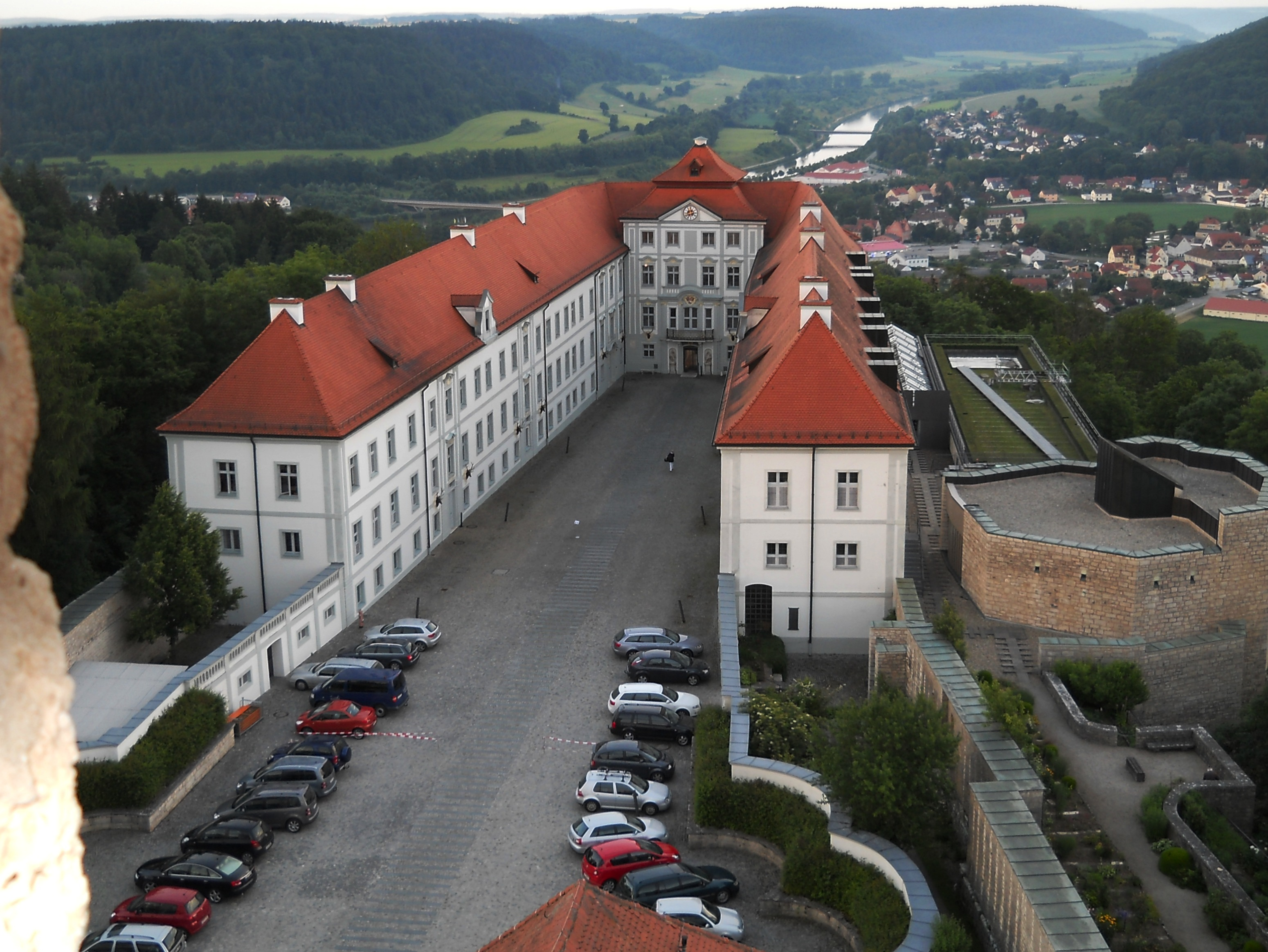
Hirschberg Castle near Beilngries, secondary residence from 1305

== See also ==
- List of Bishops of Eichstätt
- Roman Catholic Diocese of Eichstätt

== Sources ==
- (in German) Eichstätt in Meyers Konversationslexikon, 1888
- "Eichstätt". Catholic Encyclopedia.
