= List of bishops of Eichstätt =

List of the bishops of Eichstätt.

== Bishops of Eichstätt, 741–1790 ==
- Willibald 741–786
- Geroch, 786–801
- Aganus, 801–819
- Adalung, 820–841
- Altun, 841–858
- Ottokar, 858–881
- Gottschalk, 881–884
- Erkenbald, 884–916
- Udalfried, 916–933
- Starchand, 933–966
- Reginold, 966–989
- Megingoz von Lechsgemund, 989–1014
- Gundackar I, 1014–1019
- Walter, 1020–1021
- Heribert von Rothenburg, 1022–1042
- Guzmann von Rothenburg, 1042
- Gebhard of Calw, 1042–1057
- Gundackar II, 1057–1075
- Ulrich I, 1075–1099
- Eberhard I von Vohburg-Schweinfurt, 1100–1112
- Ulrich II von Bogen, 1112–1125
- Gebhard II von Hirschberg, 1125–1149
- Burkhard von Memlem, 1149–1153
- Konrad I von Morsberg, 1153–1171
- Egilolf, 1171–1182
- Otto, 1182–1195
- Hartwich I von Hirschberg, 1195–1223
- Friedrich I von Hauenstadt, 1223–1225
- Heinrich I von Ziplingen, 1225–1229
- Heinrich II von Tischlingen, 1229–1234
- Heinrich III von Ravensberg, 1234–1237
- Friedrich II von Parsberg, 1237–1246
- Heinrich IV von Württemberg, 1246–1259
- Engelhard, 1259–1261
- Hildebrand von Morn, 1261–1279
- Reimbrecht von Mulenhard, 1279–1297
- Konrad II von Pfaffenhausen, 1297–1305
- Johann I von Durbheim, 1305–1306
- Philipp von Rathsamhausen, 1306–1322
- Marquard I von Hageln, 1322–1324
- Gebhard III von Graisbacch, 1324–1327
- Friedrich III von Leuchtenberg, 1328–1329
- Friedrich IV von Nürnburg, 1328–1329
- Heinrich V Schenk von Reicheneck, 1329–1344
- Albrecht I von Hohenfels, 1344–1353
- Berthold von Nürnburg, 1355–1365
- Rhabanus Schenk von Wildburgstetten, 1365–1383
- Friedrich V von Öttingen, 1383–1415
- Johann II von Heideck, 1415–1429
- Albrecht II von Rechberg, 1429–1445
- Johann III von Eich, 1445–1464
- Wilhelm von Reichenau, 1464–1496
- Gabriel von Eyb, 1496–1535
- Christoph von Pappenheim-Stahlingen, 1535–1539
- Moritz von Hutten, 1539–1552
- Eberhard II von Hirnheim, 1552–1560
- Martin von Schaumburg, 1560–1590
- Kaspar von Seckendorf, 1590–1595
- Johann Konrad von Gemmingen, 1595–1612
- Johann Christoph von Westerstetten, 1612–1636
- Marquard II Schenk von Castell, 1637–1685
- Johann Eucharius Schenk von Castell, 1685–1697
- Johann Martin von Eyb, 1697–1704
- Johann Anton I Knebel von Katznellenbogen, 1705–1725
- Ludwig Franz Schenk von Castell, 1725–1736
- Johann Anton II von Freinerg-Hopferau, 1736–1757
- Raimondo Antonio di Strasoldo, 1757–1781
- Johann Anton III von Zehmen, 1781–1790

== Bishops of Eichstätt, 1790 - present ==
Tenure	Incumbent	Notes
21 September 1790 to 5 February 1818	Joseph Graf von Stubenberg	Priest of Salzburg; confirment 11 April 1791; ordained 13 November 1791; appointed Archbishop of Bamberg
4 March 1824 to 24 April 1825	Petrus Pustet	Priest of Regensburg; confirmed 24 May 1824; ordained 3 October 1824; died in office
12 May 1825 to 31 January 1835	Johann Friedrich Oesterreicher	Auxiliary Bishop of Bamberg; confirmed 26 June 1825; installed 9 November 1825; died in office
25 March 1835 to 15 October 1835	Johann Martin Manl	Bishop of Speyer; confirmed 6 April 1835; installed 1 July 1835; died in office
19 April 1836 to 12 July 1841	Karl-August Graf von Reisach	Priest of Munich and Freising, Munich; confirmed 11 July 1836; ordained 17 July 1836; installed 13 March 1837; appointed Coadjutor Archbishop of Munich and Freising, Munich
3 October 1846 to 6 February 1866	Georg von Oettl	Priest of Munich and Freising, Munich; confirmed 21 December 1846; ordained 7 February 1847; died in office
13 November 1866 to 5 September 1905	Franz Leopold Freiherr von Leonrod	Priest of Eichstätt; confirmed 22 February 1867; ordained 19 March 1867; died in office
5 October 1905 to 20 June 1932	Johannes Leo von Mergel, OSB	Priest of Order of Saint Benedict; confirmed 11 December 1905; ordained 27 December 1905; died in office
9 September 1932 to 5 July 1935	Konrad Graf von Preysing Lichtenegg-Moos	Priest of Munich and Freising, Munich; ordained 28 October 1932; appointed Bishop of Berlin
4 November 1935 to 5 May 1948	Michael Rackl	Priest of Eichstätt; ordained 21 December 1935; died in office
23 July 1948 to 2 January 1968	Joseph Schröffer	Priest of Eichstätt; ordained 21 September 1948; appointed Titular Archbishop of Volturnum
28 May 1968 to 1 June 1983	Alois Brems	Priest of Eichstätt; ordained 6 July 1968; retired (becoming Apostolic Administrator of Eichstätt)
17 April 1984 to 25 March 1995	Karl Heinrich Braun	appointed Archbishop of Bamberg; retired 2 July 2001
24 February 1996 to 16 July 2005	Walter Mixa	Priest of Augsburg; ordained 23 March 1996; Military Bishop of Germany 31 August 2000
14 October 2006 to present	Gregor Maria Hanke OSB	Abbott of the Abbey of Plankstetten; named to the see by Pope Benedict XVI, 14 October 2006, consecrated, 2 December 2006; by virtue of his office, Vice Magnus Cancellarius of the Catholic University of Eichstätt-Ingolstadt
