= Hortus Eystettensis =

1613 book describing garden of Bishop of Eichstatt

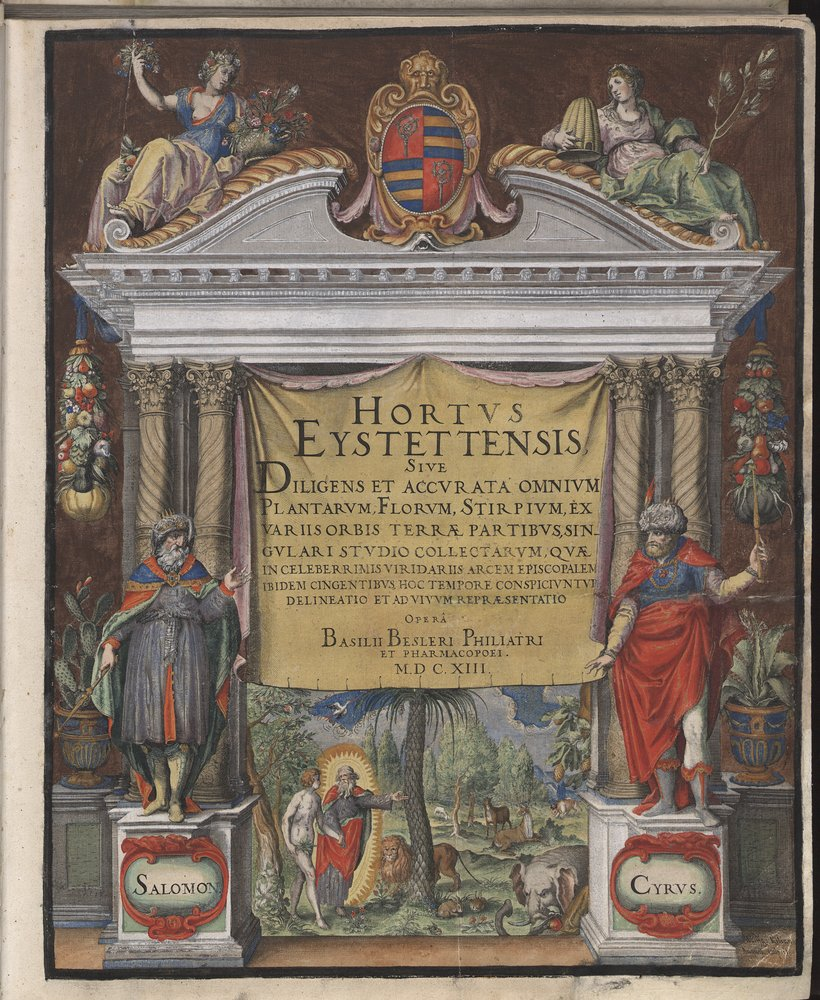
title page of the 1613 edition

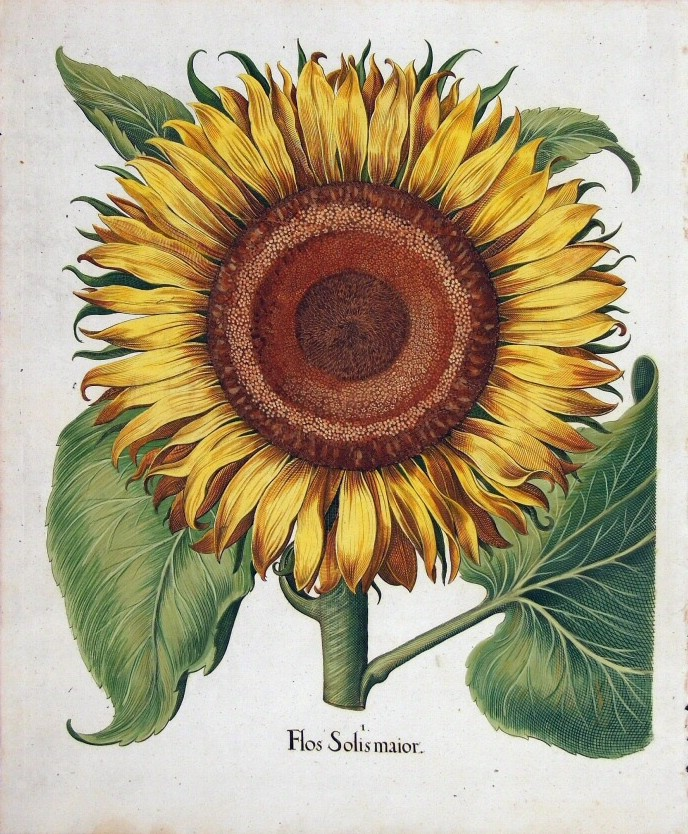
Sunflower from Hortus Eystettensis

Hortus Eystettensis (Garden of Eichstätt) is the short title of a book produced by Basilius Besler, a Nuremberg apothecary and botanist, in 1613 describing the plants of the garden of the Prince-Bishop of Eichstätt in Bavaria. The Renaissance style garden was located at the bishop's palace at the Willibaldsburg and was created over eight terraces overlooking the city of Eichstätt. It was the first botanical garden in Germany, and the only one outside of Italy. The bishop had brought plants from all over the world for his garden, and it was thought that it contained examples of all of the shrubs and flowering plants known to horticulturalists at the time.

The Bishop, Johann Konrad von Gemmingen (1561-1612), commissioned Besler, who was in charge of the garden, to produce the work in 1611, to record his achievements for posterity. Besler worked on the project for sixteen years, although the bishop died before its completion. Besler had the assistance of his brother and a group of skilled German draughtsmen and engravers, including Sebastian Schedel, an accomplished painter, and Wolfgang Kilian, a skilled engraver from Augsburg. Kilian and his team engraved the initial copper plates, but after the bishop’s death, the operations moved to Nürnberg and a new team of engravers, among whom were Johannes Leypold, Georg Gärtner, Levin and Friedrich van Hulsen, Peter Isselburg, Heinrich Ulrich, Dominicus Custos and Servatius Raeven. Camerarius' nephew, Ludwig Jungermann (1572–1653), was a botanist and wrote most of the descriptive text. On its completion it was the magnificent example of a florilegium produced to that date, and an example of a herbal.

The emphasis in botanicals of previous centuries had been on medicinal and culinary herbs, and these had usually been depicted in a crude manner. The images were often inadequate for identification, and had little claim to being aesthetic. The Hortus Eystettensis changed botanical art overnight. The plates were of garden flowers, herbs and vegetables, exotic plants such as castor oil and arum lilies. These were depicted near life-size, producing rich detail. The layout was artistically pleasing and quite modern in concept, with the hand-colouring adding greatly to the final effect. The work was first published in 1613 and consisted of 367 full-page copper engravings, with an average of three plants per page, so that a total of 1,084 species were depicted. The first edition printed 300 copies, which took four years to sell. The book was printed on large sheets measuring 57 x 46 cm. Two versions were produced, cheap black and white for use as a reference book, and a luxury version without text, printed on quality paper and lavishly hand-coloured. The luxury version sold for an exorbitant 500 florins, while the plain, uncoloured copies went for 35 florins each. Besler could finally purchase a comfortable home in a fashionable part of Nürnberg at a price of 2,500 florins – five coloured copies' worth of Hortus Eystettensis.

The work generally reflected the four seasons, showing first the flowering and then the fruiting stages. "Winter" was sparsely represented with a mere 7 plates. "Spring" was a season of abundance with 134 plates illustrating 454 plants and "Summer" in full swing showed 505 plants on 184 plates. "Autumn" closed off the work with 42 plates and 98 species. The modern French translation of the herbal appears under the title Herbier des quatres saisons, and the Italian version (1998) is L'erbario delle quattro stagioni.

Descriptions of the plants were in Latin and showed remarkable anticipation of the binomial system, in that the captions often consisted of the first two or three words of the description. Besler's portrait appears on the frontispiece holding a sprig of basil, punning on his name. The work was published twice more in Nuremberg, in 1640 and 1713, using the same plates. Three hundred twenty nine of the 366 plates were found in the Albertina in 1994.

== See also ==
- List of most expensive books and manuscripts

== Bibliography ==
- Besler, Basilius (1640) [1613]. Hortus Eystettensis, sive, Diligens et accurata omnium plantarum, florum, stirpium: ex variis orbis terrae partibus, singulari studio collectarum, quae in celeberrimis viridariis arcem episcopalem ibidem cingentibus, olim conspiciebantur delineatio et ad vivum repraesentatio et advivum repraesentatio opera (in Latin). Nürnberg.
- Barker, Nicolas (1994). Hortus Eystettensis: The Bishop's Garden and Besler's Magnificent Book. H.N. Abrams. ISBN 978-0-8109-3424-5.
- British Library (2022). "Hortus Eystettensis". British Library Treasures. Archived from the original on 27 October 2020.
- Akram, Razwana (28 February 2017). "The Garden of Eichstatt". Royal Botanic Gardens, Kew.
- Chetham's Library (2022). "Besler's Hortus Eystettensis". Collections.
- Hortus Eystettensis at the Service de la documentation University of Strasbourg
- Online version of the Teylers Museum copy of the Hortus Eystettensis 1613 luxury edition (hand-coloured, text in manuscript).
