= Post-Mortem (Coward play) =

Post-Mortem is a one-act play in eight scenes, written in 1930 by Noël Coward. He wrote it after appearing in, and being moved by, an earlier play about World War I, Journey's End by R. C. Sherriff. As soon as he had completed writing it, however, he decided that it was suitable for publication but not for production.

The play was first staged in a prisoner of war camp in Eichstätt, Germany, in 1944. In 1966, the first full public performance was mounted by Lord Williams's Grammar School, Thame. A television version was broadcast in 1968. The play was not professionally presented on stage until 1992, two decades after Coward's death. Critical opinion has generally agreed with Coward about the effectiveness of the play onstage, although it includes some techniques that Coward used elsewhere with greater success.

== Background ==
In 1930, Coward briefly played the role of Stanhope in R. C. Sherriff's play Journey's End, set in the trenches of World War I. He did not consider his performance successful, writing afterwards that his audience "politely watched me take a fine part in a fine play and throw it into the alley." However, he was "strongly affected by the poignancy of the play itself" and wrote his own "angry little vilification of war" shortly afterwards. As soon as it was written, he decided that it was for publication only and should not be staged, and he published it in 1931. The press commented on the absence of a production: "Mr Noel Coward, riding on the crest of such a wave of success that it might have been imagined that his least work would be bargained for, published last year a serious play, Post-Mortem, that, so far as we know, no manager made the smallest attempt to produce."

When the first volume of Coward's collected plays was published in 1934, he wrote an introduction commenting on the various plays. Reviewing the volume, the critic St. John Ervine wrote of Post-Mortem, "Mr. Coward's considered judgment on it is sound, and a sign of his rapidly maturing talent. He now regards it as 'sadly confused and unbalanced'." Reviewing the same volume, James Agate praised Coward's seriousness and reproached avant garde theatres for failing to stage the play. In 1935 a production was planned at a small provincial theatre with a reputation for staging new works, but the plans were not realised.

The play foreshadows Coward's treatment of the theme of ghosts in his 1940 play, Blithe Spirit. The middle scenes of Post-Mortem portray John as a ghost whom everyone can see, but about whose nature the other characters are apparently not greatly concerned. In the later play, there are two ghosts, which some characters can see and others cannot. The last scene uses the same technique as Ambrose Bierce's "An Occurrence at Owl Creek Bridge", where, at the end, it is revealed that most of the story occurred only within the protagonist's mind. Also used in the last scene is the portrayal of death as a shadow enveloping the one dying.

== Synopsis ==
Scene One, set in 1917 France during the First World War, focuses on John Cavan, a young British soldier, the son of a London newspaper owner. In the trenches, John argues with another soldier, Perry Lomas, over the war; Perry accuses John's father of glorifying war in his newspaper, but John denies this. At the end of the scene, John is mortally wounded by enemy fire. He is dragged back to the trench, where as he lies dying he imagines the reaction of the people he knows best to the end of the war.

The next six scenes take place in England in 1930. John, now a ghost dressed in the muddy uniform he died in, encounters family, friends, and those of his wartime comrades who have survived. He finds out what the war, ended more than ten years past, has meant to them – not much, it turns out. Perry had survived the war and has written a book, Post-Mortem, exposing the truth about the horrible treatment of British soldiers returned from "The Great War". John's mother is afraid of the book, John's father wants the book banned, and John's girlfriend treats it as a rare collector's item to be prized for its monetary worth. Perry, after a spirited monologue laying out the miserable aftermath of war, shoots himself in the head in despair.

In the last scene, back in 1917 in the trenches in France, John dies, receding into shadow, lamenting the futility of his generation's sacrifice.

== Productions ==
Post-Mortem was published in 1931, but was not staged until 1944. Its première was a production by British prisoners of war in a German camp, during World War II, at Eichstätt. The four leading parts were performed by professional actors, Michael Goodliffe, Dan Cunningham, Brian McIrvine and Desmond Llewelyn, and the play was produced and directed by a fifth professional actor and producer, Wallace Finlayson. The archive at King's College, Cambridge, England, contains "an array of photographs, handbills and programmes from Christmas pantomimes produced between 1940 and 1943, not in a local village hall, but in three POW camps in Austria". The Germans permitted the production, with as many stage costumes and props as could be devised, only after the entire cast and backstage crew had given an undertaking that they would use nothing to make an escape.

The first public performance was mounted at Lord Williams's Grammar School, Thame, in 1966 by a cast of pupils. Permission was sought from Coward with the help of the actor David Tomlinson. ITV News featured a lengthy excerpt in the evening news, and many national publications including The Guardian and the New Statesman sent critics. The first commercial presentation was a television version produced by Harry Moore for the BBC. It was first aired, on 17 September 1968, as the second episode of the BBC television series The Jazz Age, a fifteen-episode compilation of short plays about the Jazz Age. John Mackenzie directed, and Ron Grainer created the original music. The cast included Keith Barron as John Cavan, Colin Jeavons as Perry Lomas, Nora Swinburne as Lady Cavan, and Bernard Lee as Sir James.

The commercial stage première was at The King's Head Theatre, London, on 7 October 1992, directed by Richard Stirling, with a cast including Avril Angers as Lady Stagg-Mortimer, Sylvia Syms as Lady Cavan, Harry Burton as John Cavan, and Steven Pacey as Perry Lomas.

== Reception ==
Coward commented on the play: "I wrote it too hot off the grid" and, as a result, produced something that was "shallow", lacking in "real experience", and which "muddled the issues … I might have done better if I had given more time to it, and less vehemence." When the play was first published, The Daily Mirror wrote, "A fearful study in disillusionment! … The misery is, if I may use a vulgarism, laid on very thick. But there are passion and brave satire in this play. Mr Coward is to be congratulated. He is always renewing himself. I am afraid, however, that, for the stage, Post-Mortem is really too depressing to make another Journey's End. T. E. Lawrence considered the play "a fine effort, a really fine effort.... As argument it is first rate. As imagination magnificent … and gave me a thrill to read it."

The Columbia Encyclopedia of Modern Drama notes that "The British theater had abundant room for the comic Coward, but none for the angry, bitter Coward of Post-Mortem", and that Coward had two playwriting personas: one "crowd-pleasing (and) comic", the other "darker (and) serious". The Encyclopedia does not record much appreciation, if any, even years later, for this play written by Coward's dark side. However, it bestows some backhanded praise by admitting that "the play is outstanding as a polemical, vitriolic attack on British disregard for World War I victims".

When the play was staged in London in 1992, the critical response was mixed. The Times and The Independent were hostile. Benedict Nightingale of The Times wrote, "It is the sort of anti-war play you might expect from someone who never swapped a shot in anger and at some level feels guilty for having survived the slaughter: shrill, awkward.... It is just the sort of didactic plod that Coward hated when others were writing; and with good reason. The Independent praised the production, but said, "this rather hysterical anti-war play has been under cover for good reason.... [The] play's shrillness, grandiosity and caricature reflect Coward's remoteness from the battlefield as well as his denial of the contemporary mood.... [It is] a vaporous polemic, which turns oddly sentimental at the end, when John praises the joys of battle. In The Guardian, Michael Billington was more complimentary: "I respect Coward's blazing, up-front anger. In particular, he gives Lomas a powerful diatribe attacking the political confusion, economic chaos and press mendacity of Britain in 1930: a speech that is chillingly appropriate today.... What disfigures the play is not Coward's thumping message but the mechanical nature of Cavan's civilian Cook's tour and the easy caricature of soft targets: philandering press-magnates, pleasure-seeking bishops and purblind Lady Bountifuls. Surprisingly, Coward's social satire is less potent than his straightforward political anger." The Sunday Times praised both the production and the play:

I would never have guessed that this 80-minute vitriolic anti-war fantasy, written in 1930, was by Noel Coward. Its first professional production reveals it as a tough, febrile piece, awash with melodrama and blazing up now and again with bitter, glittering humour.... Coward's hatred of this brittle, blasé age, which does not want to understand the horrors of the first world war, is not so surprising as his perception that the second is already in the making: someone actually remarks that the next Olympic games (1932) could be a preparation for it. I never imagined that the Master, at 31, was so politically switched on. The writing is a little mannered, but the young cast handles it as if it was entirely real, and Steven Pacey, as the disillusioned survivor, draws a most subtle sketch of upper-class despair.

== See also ==
- List of plays with anti-war themes
