= Bavarian Administration of State-Owned Palaces, Gardens and Lakes =

Agency of the government of Bavaria, Germany

Bavarian Administration of State-Owned Palaces, Gardens and Lakes logo

The Bavarian Administration of State-Owned Palaces, Gardens and Lakes (German: Bayerische Verwaltung der staatlichen Schlösser, Gärten und Seen), also known as the Bavarian Palace Department (German: Bayerische Schlösserverwaltung), is a department of the finance ministry of the German state of Bavaria. Tracing its roots back into the 18th century, the administration is now best known for being in charge of Neuschwanstein Castle and the other 19th-century palaces built by Ludwig II of Bavaria.

The department is responsible for 45 historical monuments and ensembles. This number includes:

- 9 residences such as Munich Residence and Würzburg Residence
- 14 villas and palaces including Neuschwanstein Castle, Linderhof Palace, Herrenchiemsee
- 10 fortified sites including medieval Nuremberg Castle
- memorials such as the Befreiungshalle in Kelheim and the Ruhmeshalle and Feldherrnhalle in Munich
- the pilgrimage church St. Bartholomew's in Berchtesgaden
- theaters and opera houses including the Margravial Opera House and the Cuvilliés Theatre

It is also responsible for 27 historical gardens like Englischer Garten in Munich and 21 lakes, most notably Chiemsee, Lake Starnberg, Ammersee and the Bavarian part of Lake Constance.
