= Florilegium =

Collection of writings in medieval Latin

In medieval Latin, a florilegium (plural florilegia) was a compilation of excerpts or sententia from other writings and is an offshoot of the commonplacing tradition. The word is from the Latin flos (flower) and legere (to gather): literally a gathering of flowers, or collection of fine extracts from the body of a larger work. It was adapted from the Greek anthologia (ἀνθολογία) "anthology", with the same etymological meaning.

Later the word was used for various forms of compilation to do with flowers or plants, such as Banks' Florilegium, or just for published collections of various sorts.

== Medieval usage ==
Medieval florilegia were systematic collections of extracts taken mainly from the writings of the Church Fathers from early Christian authors, also pagan philosophers such as Aristotle, and sometimes classical writings. A prime example is the Manipulus florum of Thomas of Ireland, which was completed at the beginning of the fourteenth century. The purpose was to take passages that illustrated certain topics, doctrines or themes. After the medieval period, the term was extended to apply to any miscellany or compilation of literary or scientific character.

== Flowers ==
The term florilegia also applied literally to a treatise on flowers or medieval books that are dedicated to ornamental rather than the medicinal or widely useful plants covered by herbals. The emergence of botanical illustration as a genre of art dates back to the 15th century, when herbals (books describing the culinary and medicinal uses of plants) were printed containing illustrations of flowers. As printing techniques advanced, and new plants came to Europe from Ottoman Turkey in the 16th century, wealthy individuals and botanic gardens commissioned artists to record the beauty of these exotics in Florilegia. Florilegia flourished in the 17th century when they were created to portray rare and exotic plants from far afield. Modern florilegia seek to record collections of plants, often now endangered, from within a particular garden or place. Florilegia are among the most lavish and expensive of books because of all the work required to produce them.

== Usage ==
The word applies especially to:

- a collection of botanically accurate paintings of plants, done by botanical illustrators from life
- a patristic anthology in Christian literature
- the title of a scholarly journal published annually by the Canadian Society of Medievalists / Société canadienne des médiévistes
- the title of various literary anthologies, e.g., by Johannes Stobaeus
- the title of certain collections of musical compositions, e.g., by Georg Muffat

== Florilegium societies ==
- The Royal Botanic Gardens, Kew opened a new gallery in 2008 to display works of botanical illustration alongside pieces from the collection of Shirley Sherwood. The Shirley Sherwood Gallery was the first public gallery in the world dedicated to showing botanical art. Kew's archives contain 200,000 works of botanical art, including pieces by 18th and 19th century masters, along with works by contemporary artists.
- The Royal Botanic Gardens, Sydney formed a Florilegium Society to create a collection of paintings of the significant plants growing in the estates of the Royal Botanic Gardens & Domain Trust.
- The Friends of the Royal Botanic Gardens, Melbourne created in 2001 a florilegium of significant plants growing in the Gardens. This 21st century florilegium is held digitally and photographically, the original works are not kept.
- The Sheffield Botanical Gardens established a Florilegium Society which aims to produce an archive of botanical illustrations of the plants of Sheffield Botanical Gardens.

== See also ==
- Botanical illustration
- Catena (biblical commentary)
- Grandes Heures of Anne of Brittany
- Highgrove Florilegium
- List of florilegia and botanical codices
- Polyanthea
