= Hemke =

Hemke is a surname. Notable people with the surname include:

- Frederick Hemke (1935–2019), American saxophonist
- Fritz Hemke (born 1967), American saxophonist

== See also ==
- Henke
