= Gerhoh =

Gerhoh may refer to:

- Gerhoh of Eichstätt (d. 806), bishop of Eichstätt
- Gerhoh of Fulda (d. 818), librarian and friend of Raban Maur
- Gerhoh of Reichersberg (d. 1169), theologian
- Gerhoh von Waldeck (d. 1359), bishop of Chiemsee
- Gerhoh Steigenberger (1741–1787), Augustinian canon
