= Rationale (vestment) =

Liturgical vestment worn by Latin Catholic bishops

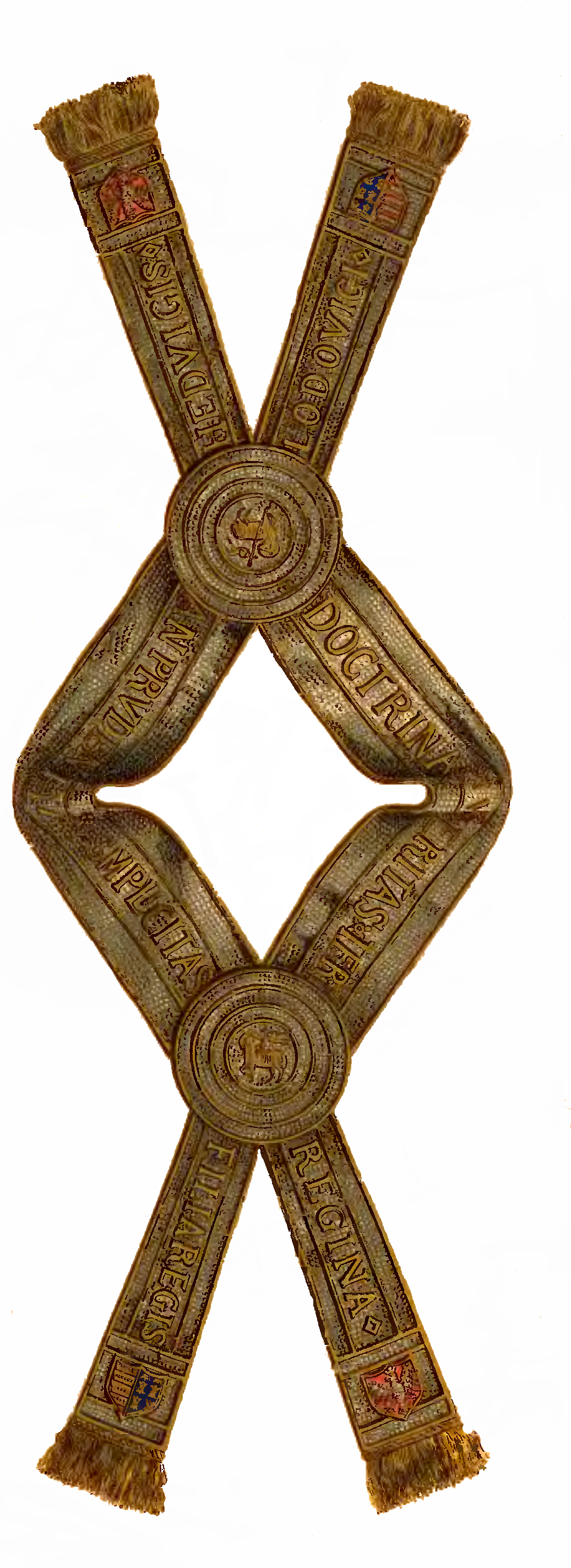
Rationale donated to the Archbishop of Kraków by queen Saint Jadwiga of Poland in 1384/85

A rationale, also called superhumerale (from Latin super, "over", and [h]umerus, "shoulder"; thus a garment worn "over the shoulder[s]"), is a liturgical vestment worn exclusively by select bishops predominantly in the Latin Church. It is mainly characterized as a humeral ornament – yet also adorning chest and back – and is worn over the chasuble. The term rationale originates from a Latin translation of the Ancient Greek λόγιον logion for the Hebrew חֹשֶׁן hoshen by St. Jerome, referring to the sacred breastplate worn by the High Priest of the Israelites, according to the Book of Exodus.

During the Middle Ages it was worn by several bishops, primarily in the Holy Roman Empire, as far spread as Regensburg, Prague and Liège. Its use largely died out in the 13th century, although there is evidence that it was worn at Reims until the 16th century. Some rationales can be found preserved at Eichstätt, Bamberg and Regensburg. The earliest pictures of rationales that exist are two pictures of Bishop Sigebert of Minden, a miniature and an ivory tablet, which were both incorporated in a Mass Ordo belonging to the bishop.

The only bishops who wear rationales in the 21st century are:

- the Bishop of Eichstätt, Germany – Gregor Maria Franz Hanke, O.S.B. (since 2006),
- the Metropolitan Archbishop of Paderborn, Germany – Hans-Josef Becker (since 2003),
- the Bishop of Toul, now Nancy (-Toul), France – Jean-Louis Papin (since 1999), and
- the Metropolitan Archbishop of Kraków, Poland – Grzegorz Ryś (since 2025).

The modern rationale is a humeral collar, ornamented in the front and back with appendages.

Rationales are occasionally still worn by episcopi vagantes in the Celtic Christian Orthodox Church, a small community with historical links to the Old Catholic Church and Eastern Orthodoxy.

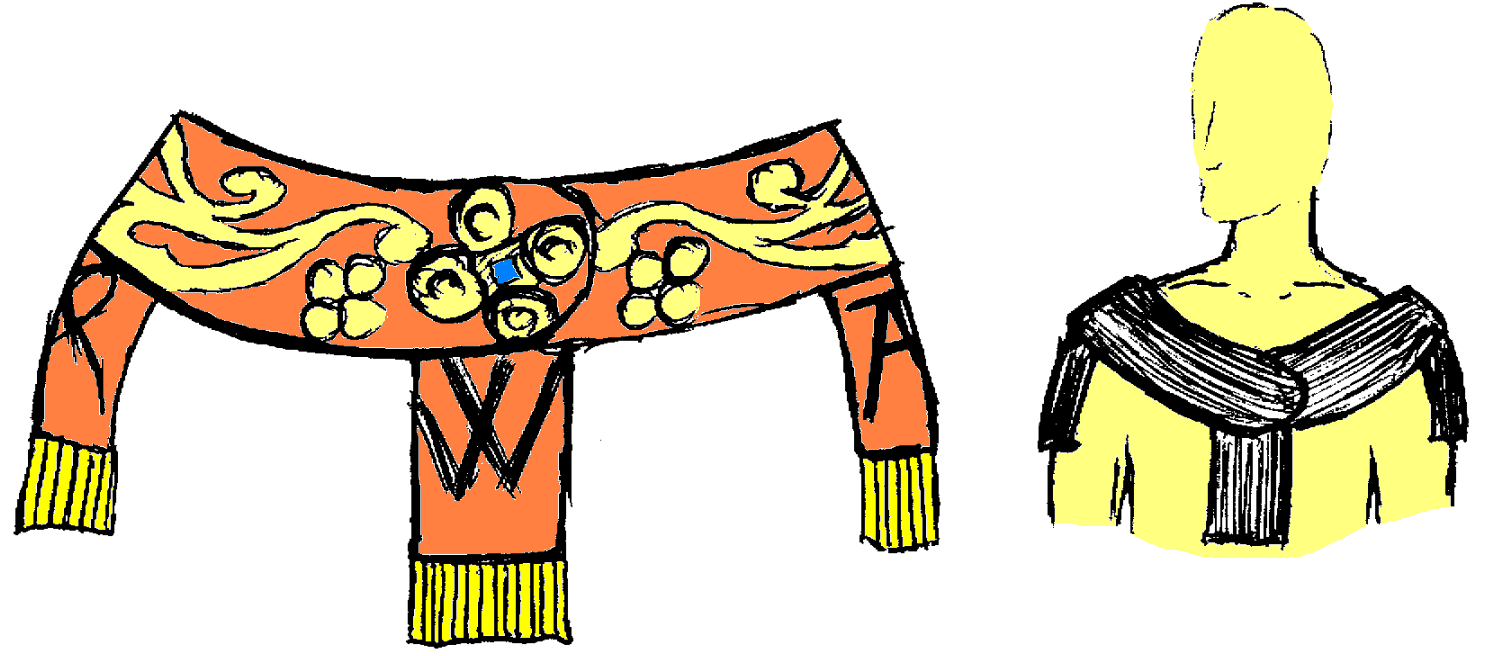
Rationale

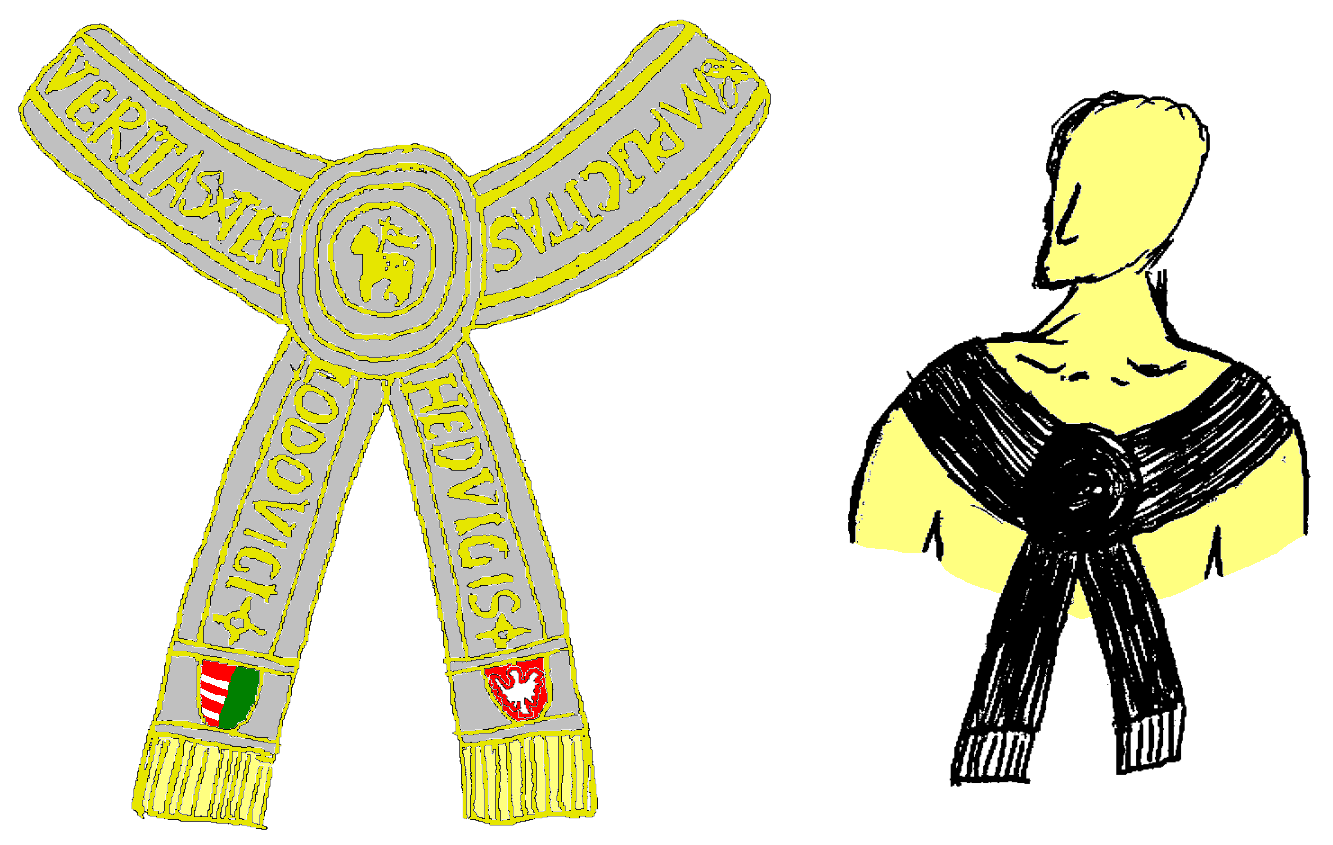
Rationale of the
Krakówian type

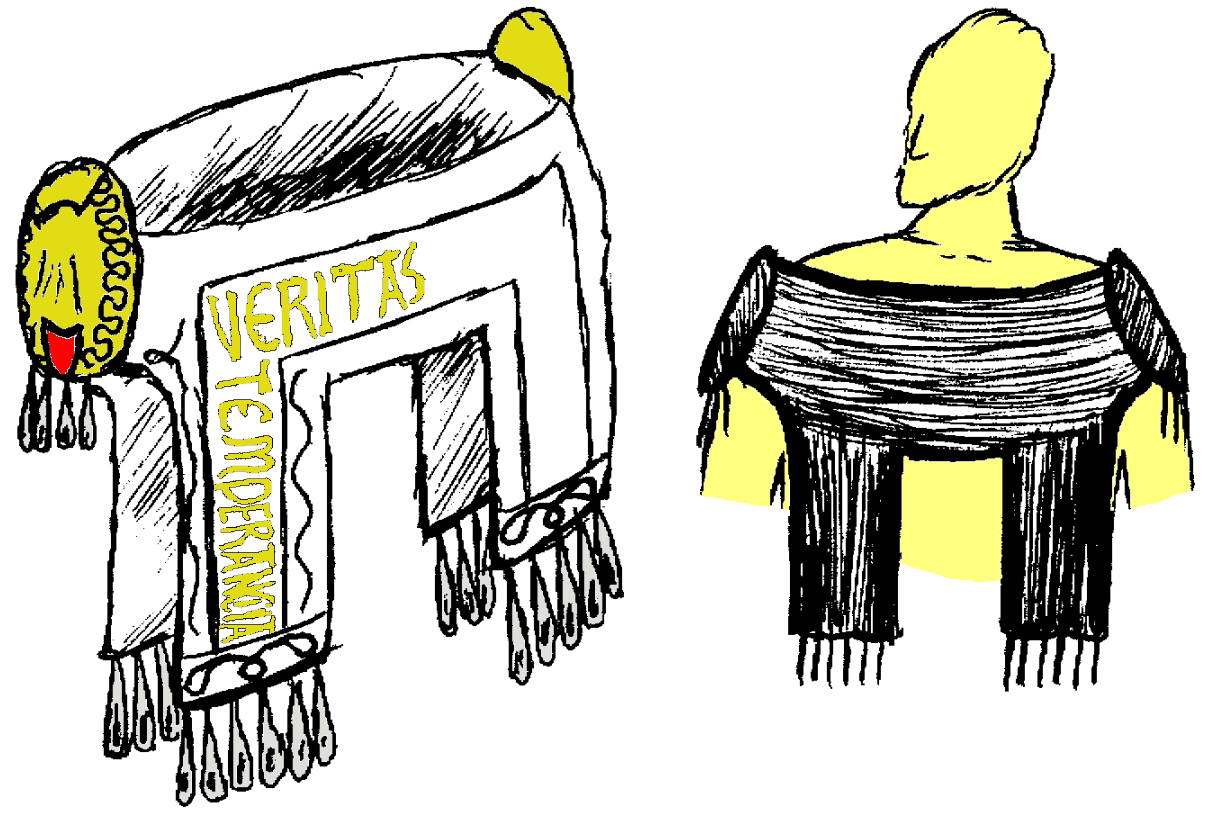
Rationale of the Eichstättian type
