= Hencke =

Hencke is a surname. Notable persons with that surname include:

- David Hencke, British investigative journalist and writer
- Karl Ludwig Hencke (1793–1866), German astronomer
- Harald Schultz-Hencke (1892–1953), German psychoanalyst

== See also ==
- Henke
- Henkes
