= Henkes =

Henkes or Henckes is a surname. Notable people with the surname include:

- Hans Henkes (born 1959), German neuroradiologist, medical director and professor.
- Jacques-Yves Henckes (born 1945), Luxembourgish jurist and politician
- Kevin Henkes (born 1960), American children's book illustrator and author
- Peter Henkes (born 1962), German former footballer

== See also ==
- Henkes Islands, Antarctica
- Henke, a surname
