= Chorherrenkäse =

Cheese variety from Tyrol, Austria

- Other names: Prälatenkäse
- Country of origin: Austria
- Region: North Tyrol/East Tyrol
- Source of milk: Cows
- Pasteurized: yes or no
- Texture: Semi-hard cheese (SK)
- Fat content: low fat
- Aging time: lactic acid maturation

Chorherrenkäse, also known as Prälatenkäse, is a semi-hard cheese made from cow's milk and sometimes buttermilk. The cheese, which is matured in lactic acid, is made in the Tyrol state of Austria.

Chorherrenkäse translates from German as "canons' cheese". As early as 1469, Chorherrenkäse was mentioned as a method of payment in the accounting books of Reichersberg Abbey.

Based on monastery or Trappist-style cheeses, Chorherrenkäse uses rennet to separate its curds and whey, was originally dipped in white wax and is now packaged in a loaf-shaped white plastic rind. The cheese is described for having a mild, buttery taste with a hint of nuttiness and is noted for its light yellow color, numerous small eyes (air bubbles) and white rind. It is recommended that Chorherrenkäse "rest" in its manufacture.

Chorherrenkäse is similar to other cheeses from Austria, e.g., Schärdinger Amadeus, another mild, semi-firm light yellow cheese — manufactured in Austria — but in Styria rather than Tyrol.

== See also ==
- List of cheeses
