= Hanke =

Hanke or Hancke is a surname of Silesian origin. It is most common in Silesia, Czech Republic, Germany, Denmark, and Sweden, but now widely found in the United States, South Africa, and the United Kingdom. Hanke is also a male first name in Bohemia and Germany.

== People ==
- Brunhilde Hanke (1930–2024), German politician
- Christopher J. Hanke (b. 1976) actor
- Edith Hancke German stage, film and television actress (1928–2015)
- Gregor Maria Franz Hanke (b. 1954), German Roman catholic bishop
- Henriette Hanke née Arndt (1785–1862), German writer
- Hugon Hanke (1904–1964), former Polish politician
- Jan Alois Hanke (1751–1806), Bohemian humanist, writer in Czech and German
- Karl Hanke (1903–1945), Nazi Party official
- Karol Hanke (1903–1964), former Polish football player.
- Lewis Hanke (1905–1993), American historian and professor, father of Latin American Studies
- Mike Hanke (b. 1983), German football player
- Reginald Hanke (b. 1956), German politician
- Sonya Hanke (1933–1983), Australian classical pianist
- Stephan Hanke (b. 1972), German soccer player
- Steve H. Hanke, economist
- Piotr Hancke (born 2002/2003), better known as Łatwogang, Polish singer and social media influencer
- Thaddäus Haenke (1761–1816), explorer

== See also ==
- Handke
- Henke
