= Camilo Gomez =

Camilo Gomez may refer to:

- Camilo R. Gomez (born 1960), American neurologist
- Camilo Gómez (born 1984), Colombian road cyclist

== See also ==
- Camilo (singer), who joined Selena Gomez to record "999"
- Camila Gómez (born 1995), Colombian volleyball player
