= Gerhoh of Reichersberg =

Blessed Gerhoh of Reichersberg
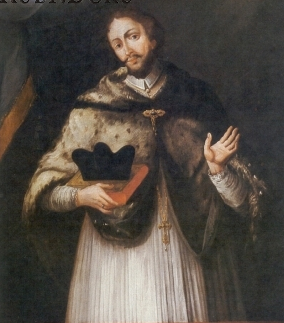
- painting by Franz Winhauser, 1620, Reichersberg Abbey

provost of Reichersberg
- Born: c. 1093; Polling, Weilheim-Schongau
- Residence: Reichersberg Abbey
- Died: 27 June 1169
- Honored in: Catholic Church
- Major shrine: Reichersberg Abbey
- Feast: 27 June
- Major works: Commentarius in Psalmos

Gerhoh of Reichersberg (Latin: Gerhohus Reicherspergensis. b. at Polling 1093; d. at Reichersberg, 27 June 1169) was one of the most distinguished theologians of Germany in the twelfth century. He was provost of Reichersberg Abbey and a Canon Regular.

He studied at Freising, Moosburg, and Hildesheim. In 1119, Bishop Hermann of Augsburg called him as "scholasticus" to the cathedral school of that city; shortly afterwards, though still a deacon, he made him a canon of the cathedral. Gradually Gerhoh adopted a stricter ecclesiastical attitude, and eventually withdrew (1121) from the simoniacal Bishop Hermann, and took refuge in the monastery of Raitenbuch in the Diocese of Freising. After the Concordat of Worms (1122) Bishop Hermann was reconciled with the legitimate pope, Callistus II, whereupon Gerhoh accompanied the bishop to the Lateran Council of 1123. On his return from Rome Gerhoh resigned his canonicate, and with his father and two half-brothers joined the Austin canons at Raitenbuch (1124).

Bishop Kuno of Ratisbon ordained him a priest in 1126, and gave him the parish of Cham, which he later resigned under threats from Hohenstaufen followers whom he had offended at the Synod of Würzburg in 1127. He returned to Ratisbon, and in 1132 Conrad I of Abensberg, Archbishop of Salzburg, appointed him provost of Reichersberg, to the spiritual and material advantage of that monastery. Archbishop Conrad sent him several times on special missions to Rome.

In 1143, he also accompanied, together with Arnold of Brescia, Cardinal Guido de Castro Ficeclo on his embassy to Bohemia and Moravia, where they promoted the canonical election of ecclesiastical dignitaries, clerical celibacy, and stricter monastic discipline. Gerhoh is particularly known for his role in the deposition of the abbess of the Benedictine convent in Prague.

Eugene III (1145–53) held Gerhoh in high esteem; his relations with the successors of that pope were less pleasant. On the occasion of the disputed papal election in 1159 (Alexander III and Victor IV) Gerhoh sided with Alexander III, but only after long hesitation; for this action the imperial party looked on him with hatred. For refusing to support the antipope, Archbishop Conrad was condemned to banishment in 1166, and the monastery of Reichersberg was repeatedly attacked; Gerhoh himself was forced to take refuge in flight, and died soon after his return to Reichersberg.

Gerhoh was a reformer in the spirit of the Gregorian ideas. He aimed particularly and zealously at the reform of the clergy; it seemed to him that this object could not be attained unless the community life were generally adopted.

Blessed Gerhoh of Reichersberg is venerated in Catholic Church, his feast day is 24 June or 27 June.

== Works ==
Gerhoh compiled the Annales Reicherspergenses (Annals of Reichersberg), which cover the years 921–1167. His pupil, Magnus of Reichersberg, continued them down to 1195 and later writers added material down to 1279.

His reformist views and his ecclesiastical policy are set forth in the following works:

- De ædificio Dei seu de studio et cura disciplinæ ecclesiasticæ (P.L., CXCIV, 1187–1336; Ernst Sackur, 136-202)
- Tractatus adversus Simoniacos (P.L., 1335–1372; Sackur, 239–272; see also Jaksch in Mittheilungen des Instituts für österreichische Geschichtsforschung, VI [1885], 254-69)
- Liber epistolaris ad Innocentium II. Pont. Max. de eo quis distet inter clericos sæculares et regulares (P.L., CXCIV, 1375–1420; Sackur, 202-239)
- De novitatibus hujus sæculi ad Adrianum IV Papam (selections in Grisar and in Sackur, 288-304).
- the important work written in 1162, De investigatione Anti-Christi libri III [selections in P.L., CXCIV, 1443–1480; see also Stülz in Archiv für österreichische Geschichte, XXII (1858), 127–188; selections in Scheibelberger, see below; book I complete in Sackur, 304-395]
- De schismate ad cardinales [Mühlbacher in Archiv für österreichische Geschichte, XLVII (1871), 355–382; Sackur, 399-411]
- his last work is the De quarta vigilia noctis [Oesterreichische Vierteljahresschrift für kath. Theologie X (1871), 565–606; Sackur, 503-525].

His principal work was Commentarius in Psalmos (P.L., CXCIII, 619–1814; CXCIV, 1-1066). Despite its unfinished state, it contains various material of historical interest. This is particularly true of his commentary on Ps. lxiv, that appeared separately as Liber de corrupto Ecclesiæ statu ad Eugenium III Papam (P.L., CXCIV, 9-120); Sackur, 439-92).

There are also a number of polemical works and letters against the Christological views of Abelard, Gilbert de la Porrée, and Bishop Eberhard of Bamberg; others deal with the errors of Folmar, Provost of Triefenstein, on the subject of the Holy Eucharist.

The genuineness of the Vitæ beatorum abbatum Formbacensium Berengeri et Wirntonis, O.S.B., generally ascribed to Gerhoh, is denied by Wattenbach. The Migne edition of Gerhoh's works is faulty and incomplete. Those of his writings which are of importance for the study of the history of that period were edited by Sackur in the Monumenta Germaniæ Historica: Libelli de lite imperatorum et pontificum, III (Hanover, 1897), 131–525; also by Scheibelberger, Gerhohi Opera adhuc inedita (Linz, 1875).
