= Christian Würtz =

German Roman Catholic prelate (born 1971)

The Most Reverend Christian Würtz
- Bishop of Eichstätt
- Appointed: 7 July 2026
- Predecessor: Gregor Maria Hanke
- Previous posts: Auxiliary Bishop of Freiburg and Titular Bishop of Germania in Dacia (2019–2026)

Orders
- Ordination: 14 May 2006 by Robert Zollitsch
- Consecration: 30 June 2019 by Stephan Burger

Personal details
- Born: 31 May 1971 (age 55) Karlsruhe, West Germany
- Education: University of Heidelberg, University of Freiburg, University of Würzburg
- Motto: Adveniat Regnum Tuum
- Coat of arms

Christian Würtz (born 31 May 1971) is a German Roman Catholic prelate who has served as bishop of the Diocese of Eichstätt since July 2026. He previously served as an auxiliary bishop of the Archdiocese of Freiburg from 2019 to 2026. At the time of his episcopal consecration in 2019, he was the youngest Catholic bishop in Germany.

== Early life and education ==
Würtz was born in Karlsruhe. After graduating from high school in 1990, he studied law at the University of Heidelberg from 1991 to 1996 and passed his first state examination in law.

From 1995 to 2004, he worked as a research assistant at Freiburg University's Institute for History of Law and Legal History, earning a doctorate in law (Dr. iur.) in 2002. He concurrently studied Catholic theology from 1996 to 2001, later obtaining a doctorate in theology (Dr. theol.) in 2011 with a dissertation on the Freiburg theologian and Nazi opponent Joseph Sauer.

== Priesthood ==
Würtz entered the Collegium Borromaeum Seminary in Freiburg in 2004. He was ordained a deacon in December 2005 and ordained a priest for the Archdiocese of Freiburg on 14 May 2006 by Archbishop Robert Zollitsch.

His pastoral assignments included serving as a vicar in Gengenbach (2006–2010) and as a parish priest in Vorderes Kinzigtal (2010–2013). In 2013, he became the city dean of Karlsruhe and pastor of the local parish community. From 2018 to 2019, he served as the rector of the Archbishop's Seminary in Freiburg and as a judge at the diocesan court.

== Episcopal ministry ==
On 26 April 2019, Pope Francis appointed Würtz auxiliary bishop of Freiburg and titular bishop of Germania in Dacia. He received his episcopal consecration on 30 June 2019 from Archbishop Stephan Burger in Freiburg Minster. At age 48, he was the youngest Catholic bishop in Germany.

On 7 July 2026, Pope Leo XIV appointed Würtz bishop of the Diocese of Eichstätt, succeeding Gregor Maria Hanke. Unlike German dioceses where the Cathedral Chapter chooses the bishop, the Pope freely appoints the Bishop of Eichstätt.
