= Handke =

Handke is a surname. Notable people with the surname include:

- Johann Christoph Handke (1694–1774), Moravian baroque painter
- Georg Ulrich Handke (1894-1962), German politician
- Peter Handke (born 1942), Austrian writer and playwright
- Mirosław Handke (1946-2021), Polish chemist and politician
- Jürgen Handke (born 1954), German linguist
- Rebecca Handke (born 1986), German pair skater
- Christopher Handke (born 1989), German footballer

== See also ==
- Hanke
