= Camilo R. Gomez =

American neurologist (born 1960)

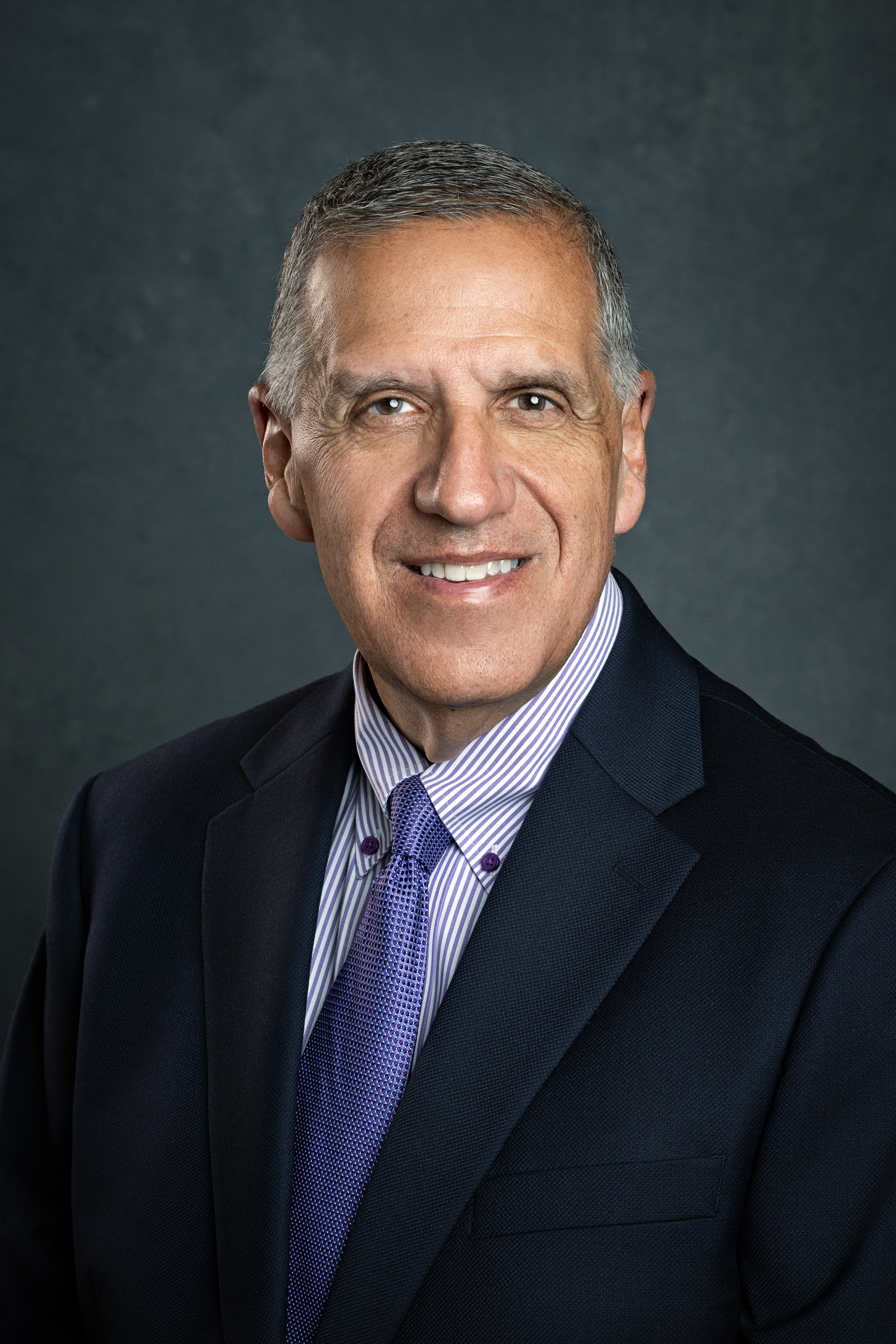
- Gomez in 2024
- Born: Camilo Ramiro Gomez; September 12, 1960 (age 65); Holguín, Oriente, Cuba
- Education: Universidad Central del Este, University of Tennessee at Knoxville
- Spouse: Kayla Kitchens Fricks
- Children: Cristina Cecilia and Camilo Aristides
- Scientific career
- Fields: Vascular Neurology, Critical Care Neurology and Interventional Neurology
- Workplaces: University of Missouri Columbia

Camilo Ramiro Gomez (born September 12, 1960) is an American neurologist, medical educator, and researcher. He is one of the first 100 vascular neurologists certified by the American Board of Psychiatry and Neurology (ABPN). Also, he is one of the founders of the subspecialty of interventional neurology in the United States and one of the first 50 to be certified in this field by the United Council for Neurologic Subspecialties

He has published extensively and is credited with having coined the phrase Time is Brain! to denote the urgency required in the treatment of stroke patients. He also introduced the term "Code Stroke" as an in-hospital method for summoning specialists to the stroke patient bedside.

== Early life ==
Gomez was born in Holguín, Cuba and emigrated in 1965, his family settling in Caracas, Venezuela. There, he attended the Fray Luis Amigo and Santo Tomas de Villanueva catholic schools. Later, in 1981, he received a M.D. from the Universidad Central del Este in San Pedro de Macorís, Dominican Republic, and immediately emigrated to the United States to continue postgraduate education in neurology at Saint Louis University

== Career ==
In 1986, having completed his neurology residency, he became the founding director of the Saint Louis University stroke center, incorporating a neurovascular ultrasound laboratory dedicated to the application of the new diagnostic technique of Transcranial Doppler. This work earned the first EME Transcranial Doppler Research Award in 1990, and caught the attention of Sylvia N. Souers, widow of the late Admiral Sidney W. Souers, who later agreed to donate a portion of her estate to the creation of the Souers Stroke Institute, which Gomez directed until 1995.

In 1995, he was recruited by the University of Alabama at Birmingham (UAB) and became the founding director of its Comprehensive Stroke Center, a post that he held until 2003. He then switched to private practice, maintained an adjunct appointment to the UAB School of Public Health, and remained the principal neurology investigator of the Reasons for Geographic and Racial Differences in Stroke (REGARDS), a federally funded project intended to uncover the underlying causes for the existence of the Stroke Belt.

In 2015 he led the team that secured Primary Stroke Center certification by The Joint Commission for Brookwood Medical Center and, in 2016, he became Professor of Neurology and Neurosurgery at Loyola University Chicago, Stritch School of Medicine. At that institution, he also was Vice-Chairman of the Department of Neurology, and Medical Director of the Neuroendovascular Surgery Program at Loyola University Medical Center. In 2019, he joined the faculty of the department of neurology at the University of Missouri School of Medicine in Columbia, Missouri, continuing to practice vascular and interventional neurology within the University of Missouri Health Care System.

=== Neuroimaging and Interventional neurology ===
He joined the American Society of Neuroimaging (ASN) in the mid-1980s, serving in its board of directors for over ten years, and as its president between 2007 and 2009. He was instrumental in the education and certification of neurologists in diagnostic vascular ultrasound, computed tomography (CT), magnetic resonance imaging (MRI), and angiography. Following his seminal endovascular work in St. Louis, upon moving to UAB, he continued to collaborate closely with interventional cardiologists and radiologists, becoming a member of the team that largely influenced the application of carotid artery stenting for stroke prevention. He also worked closely with interventional neuroradiologists and neurosurgeons of the Instituto Nacional de Neurología y Neurocirugía in Mexico City, exchanging working visits several times each year, and leading to a productive interaction in the endovascular management of cerebral aneurysms. The 1990s witnessed an interventional turf war between the three major specialties with stakes in the practice of neuroendovascular procedures, namely neurology, neurosurgery and neuroradiology. During this period, Gomez took part on behalf of the American Academy of Neurology (AAN) in negotiating a common educational pathway and, as a byproduct, vascular neurology became an accredited subspecialty, as well as a prerequisite for neurologists training in interventional neuroradiology. His work on mechanical neuroendovascular rescue of acute ischemic stroke preceded the approval by the U.S. Food and Drug Administration (FDA) of devices specifically designed for this purpose, culminating in the widespread acceptance of endovascular thrombectomy as an urgent treatment strategy in these cases.

=== Urgent Stroke Management and Critical Care Neurology ===
In the early 1990s he coined the phrase Time is Brain!, as an argument for the need to expedite the treatment of stroke victims at a time when this was not the norm, and also introduced one of the first experiences using a "Code Stroke" system for managing stroke patients, in parallel to the existing procedures for treating patients with cardiac arrest. He promoted the use of hypothermia for the management of critically ill neurologic patients, including stroke, a subject highlighted in a 2001 article and television piece by CNN. He partnered with the Birmingham Regional Emergency Medical Services System (BREMSS) to construct a regional stroke transportation system that was unique in the country. The product served as a model for national guidelines. It became operational in 2000 and, for the first time, used a dedicated computerized system to link dedicated stroke centers within the six counties that surround the city of Birmingham, allowing them to work in a symbiotic way. The system included a process for certifying stroke centers based upon a set of criteria, anteceding the current stroke center certification process by the Joint Commission. He is also certified in Neurocritical Care by the American Board of Psychiatry and Neurology (ABPN).

== Military service ==
In 1986 he joined the U.S. Army Medical Corps, becoming a member of the Saint Louis University Medical Detachment of the 21st General Hospital, 102nd Army Reserve Command (ARCOM). In December 1990, he was called to active duty in support of Operation Desert Storm, and was honorably discharged in 1994.

== Honors and awards ==
Gomez was the commencement speaker for the graduation ceremonies at Universidad Central del Este in 1988 and is a member of the Phi Kappa Phi and Beta Gamma Sigma honor societies in business. He has been listed in several editions of Best Doctors in America. In 1990, he was awarded the first Eden Medical Electronics (EME) Transcranial Doppler Research Award for his work on cerebral perfusion during cardiopulmonary resuscitation and, in 2000, the Birmingham Regional EMS (BREMSS) awarded him the R. Floyd Yarborough EMS Award for being instrumental in organizing the care of stroke patients in the counties that surround the city of Birmingham, Alabama. He then received the Interventional Pioneer Award by the Society of Vascular and Interventional Neurology (SVIN) during their inaugural meeting in 2007.

== Business degree ==
In 2006, he completed and earned the degree of Master in Business Administration (MBA) from the Physician Executive MBA (PEMBA) program at the University of Tennessee at Knoxville.

== Personal life ==
He married Sandra Maria Lopez Quiroga in 1981, but they divorced in 2007 after having had two children. He is currently married to Kayla Kitchens Fricks.

== Publications (books only) ==
- Tegeler CH, Babikian VL and Gomez CR. Neurosonology. Mosby-Yearbook Publishers. St. Louis, MO. 1996
- McCartney JP, Thomas-Lukes KM and Gomez CR. Handbook of Transcranial Doppler. Springer-Verlag Publishers. New York, 1997.
- Geyer JD and Gomez CR. Stroke: A Practical Approach. Lippincott. Philadelphia, PA. 2009.
- Gomez CR. The Downgrading of American Healthcare, Kindle Direct Publishing. 2012
- Gomez CR. Missouri Wines Uncorked!, CK Publishing, LLC. 2024
