= Plankstetten Abbey =

Coordinates: 49°04′07″N 11°27′14″E

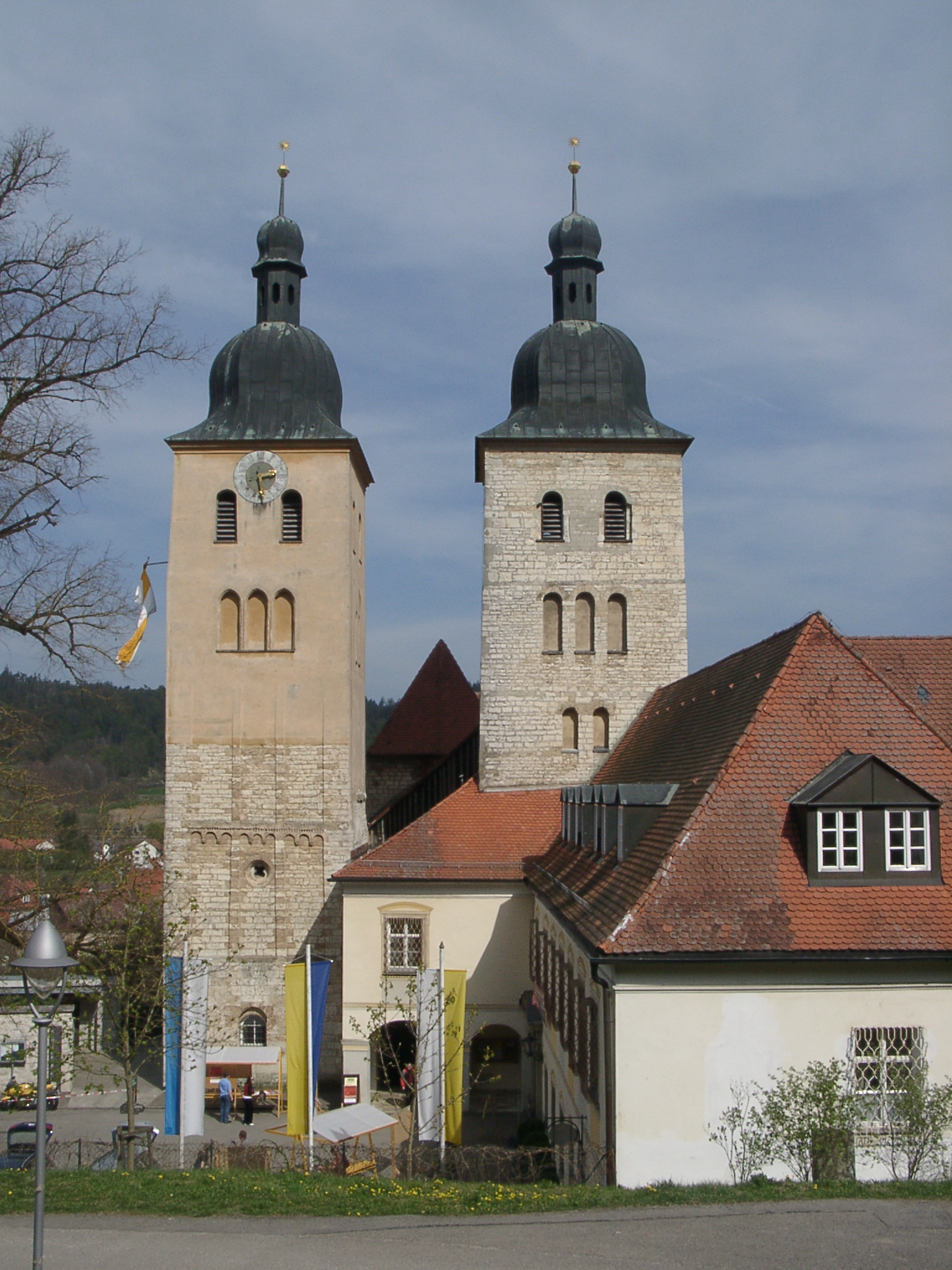
Plankstetten Abbey

Plankstetten Abbey (Kloster Plankstetten) is a monastery of the Benedictines located between Berching and Beilngries in Bavaria, Germany. It is a member of the Bavarian Congregation of the Benedictine Confederation.

== First foundation ==
The monastery was founded in 1129 as a private monastery of the bishops of Eichstätt by Count Ernst of Hirschberg and his brother Gebhard of Hirschberg, Bishop of Eichstätt. The Romanesque crypt remains from the time of the foundation.

After the decline in monastic standards in the 15th century, the abbey was reformed by Abbot Ulrich IV Dürner (1461–94), who also founded the brewery. The abbey was badly damaged during the German Peasants' War (1525) and again in the Thirty Years' War (1618–48).

Major buildings works in the Baroque style were undertaken from the end of the 17th century. Under Abbot Romanus Dettinger (1694–1703), he created the entrance gateway with the abbot's lodging above it, the Prelates' Hall and the Banqueting Hall, as well as the corner tower on the way to the inner courtyard. The next abbot, Dominikus II Heuber (1704–11), continued the building works with the move of the sacristy and the construction of the new brewery (now the library).

Later in the century, Abbot Dominikus IV Fleischmann (1757–92) undertook the refurbishment of the abbey church. The crossing chapels are due to him; their stucco work was carried out by Johann Jakob Berg, stucco master to the court of Eichstätt. Dominikus IV was also responsible for the guesthouse opposite the main gateway.

In 1806, in the course of the secularisation of Bavaria, the monastery was dissolved and the buildings and estates auctioned off.

== Second foundation ==
As early as 1856, there were plans to re-found the abbey, but these came to nothing, as the government authorities refused to give the necessary consents.

Finally, in 1904, thanks to the financial support of the Barons Cramer-Klett, Plankstetten was re-settled as a priory of Scheyern Abbey and was raised again to the status of abbey in 1917.

A school of agriculture was opened in Bavaria in 1907. It was closed by the National Socialists in 1934.

In 1958, a "Realschule" with a boarding house was opened in Bavaria. The school closed in 1988. This caused the abbey to re-examine their role and possible options, and the community now runs a training centre, a monastery shop, a farm, a nursery for plants, a butchery and a bakery, which have been organic since 1994. The boarding facilities are now used as a guesthouse.

The first Young People's Vespers took place in Plankstetten on 17 October 1980 and have since become a regular event on the third Friday in every month. They are based on the youth vespers of the Benedictine abbey at Kremsmünster in Austria and on the prayers of Taizé.

The abbey also has parish responsibilities for Plankstetten and a neighbouring village.
