= Hans Henkes =

German neuroradiologist (born 1959)

- Born: 1959 (age 66–67); Zweibrücken, Germany
- Education: Freie Universität Berlin
- Known for: Development of the stent retriever
- Scientific career
- Fields: Neuroradiology
- Workplaces: Klinikum Charlottenburg at Freie Universität Berlin (1985–1990); Universitätsklinikum des Saarlandes (1990–1991); Alfried Krupp Krankenhaus Rüttenscheid (1991–2006); Robert-Janker-Klinik (2004–2006); Klinikum Stuttgart (2007–present)

Hans Henkes (born 1959) is a German neuroradiologist, medical director of the neuroradiological department at Klinikum Stuttgart and professor at the University of Duisburg-Essen. He co-invented the Solitaire stent, which he used for the first successful intracranial thrombectomy with a stent retriever in 2008.

== Biography ==
Henkes was born in 1959 in Zweibrücken, Rhineland-Palatinate, Germany. After his Abitur in 1977, he studied medicine and later psychology at the Free University of Berlin, at this time (1977 until 1985) in West Berlin. After his medical state exam, he began working as a resident doctor at Klinikum Charlottenburg of the university in the department of clinical neurophysiology, but switched to the department of radiology of the same university hospital to work under Roland Felix. He received his doctorate in 1989.

Starting in 1990, Henkes worked as a resident at the Institute for Neuroradiology of the Universitätsklinikum des Saarlandes in Homburg/Saar under Uwe Piepgras, where he completed his board certification in radiology. At the end of 1991, he transferred to become a resident at the Klinik für Radiologie und Neuroradiologie at Alfried Krupp Krankenhaus Rüttenscheid in Essen under Dietmar Kühne, where he completed his board certification (Teilgebietsanerkennung) in neuroradiology. Henkes became an attending physician in 1995, followed by a promotion to vice director in 2000; simultaneously, he worked as a medical director for radiology and neuroradiology at the Robert-Janker-Klinik in Bonn between 2004 and 2006.

Since January 2007, Henkes has been the medical director for neuroradiology at Klinikum Stuttgart. He co-founded Dendron GmbH, which was sold to Micro Therapeutics, Inc. (MTI) in 2002. He later co-founded phenox GmbH and femtos GmbH, which were sold to Wallaby Medical in 2022.

== Research ==
Henkes received his habilitation at University of Duisburg-Essen in 1999 under Michael Forsting, where he has held the position of außerplanmäßiger professor since 2006. His research is focused on interventional neuroradiology, particularly the treatment of strokes and aneurysms. He is a named co-inventor on 69 patents and has authored more than 500 scientific publications. In 2012, he received an honorary doctorate from Dnipro State Medical University, followed by Semmelweis University and Medical University, Sofia (both in 2021).

=== Stroke and thrombectomy ===
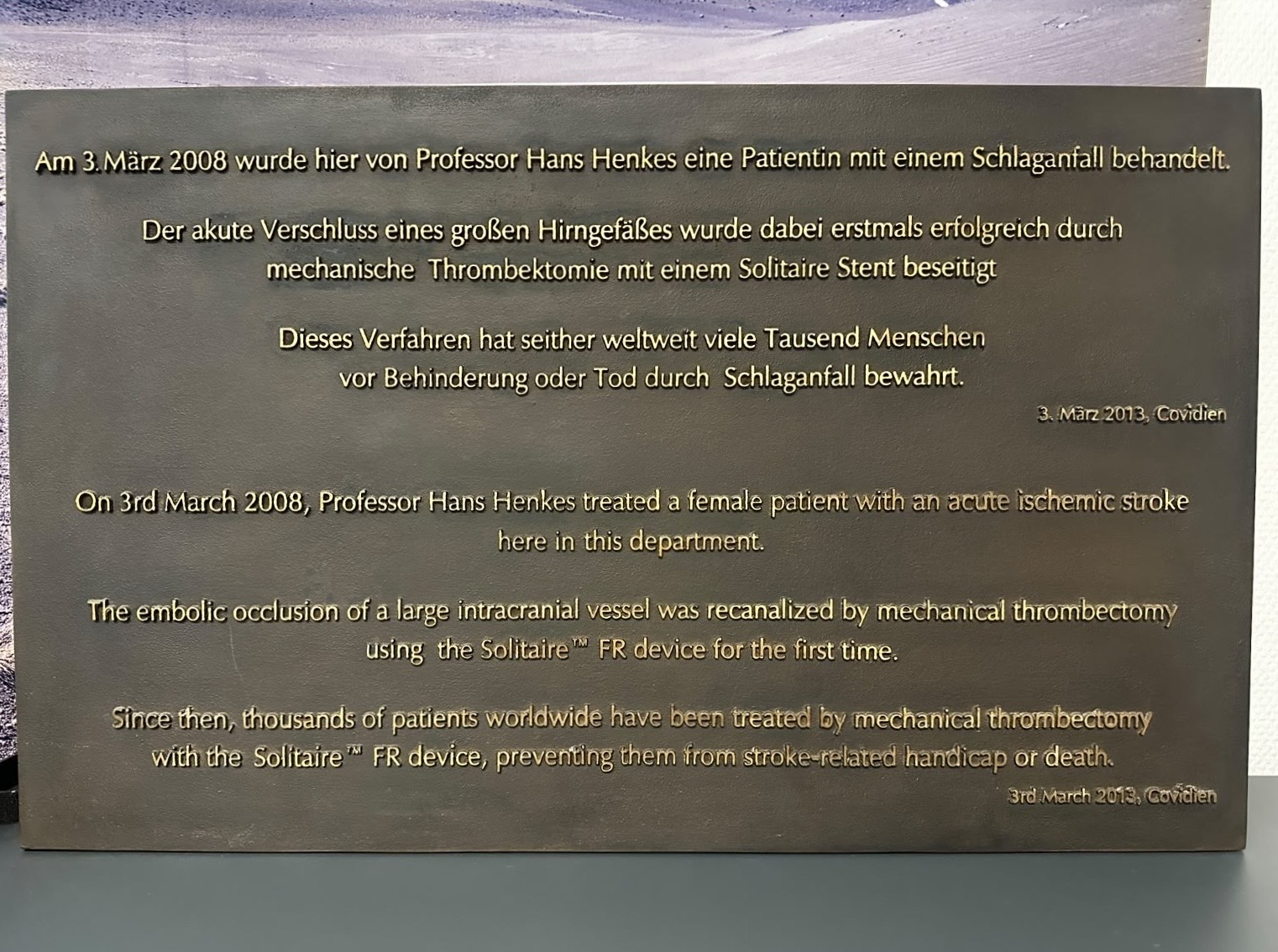
Commemorative plaque for the first successful stent-retriever thrombectomy, which took place at Klinikum Stuttgart (2008)

Henkes is one of the main contributors to the development and use of stent retrievers to treat strokes. The Solitaire stent was developed by Henkes with his colleagues in 2004, originally intended to treat aneurysms. In 2008, he used it for the first stent retriever thrombectomy, which refers to the removal of a blood clot from a closed blood vessel in the brain using a stent retriever.

As pharmaceutical and other interventions were unsuccessful and no alternative approved treatments were available at the time, he inserted a catheter through an artery in the groin into the closed blood vessel in the brain, where the stent retriever was opened into the blood clot. After some time, the stent retriever, which was now holding the clot, was removed. The results were confirmed with angiography.

In 2015 a randomized clinical trial published in the New England Journal of Medicine showed that mechanical thrombectomy combined with pharmaceutical intervention was medically superior compared to pharmaceutical intervention (intravenous fibrinolysis) alone. Later studies confirmed this result. Henkes received the Award of Excellence and Innovation in Interventional Radiology from the Cardiovascular and Interventional Radiological Society of Europe for this development in 2017; CIRSE estimated at the time that Solitaire had been used to save thousands of lives and prevent many adverse stroke outcomes. In 2023, he received the Alfred Breit Prize from the Deutsche Röntgengesellschaft for his contribution to stroke treatment.

=== Aneurysms ===
Henkes, working together with Hermann Monstadt, improved a treatment for aneurysms in the late 1990s. During the operation, a microcatheter was inserted through the groin into the blood vessels inside the head, where platinum embolization coils were deployed into the aneurysm to trigger clotting. They replaced the traditional detachment with direct current with using a laser through an optical fiber, which reduced deployment time significantly.

In addition to the Solitaire stent, Henkes is the co-inventor of multiple other implants for the treatment of aneurysms, such as pCONUS, p48/p64 and pEGASUS.
