= Gregor Maria Hanke =

German writer, priest and theologian

- Bishop Emeritus of Eichstätt
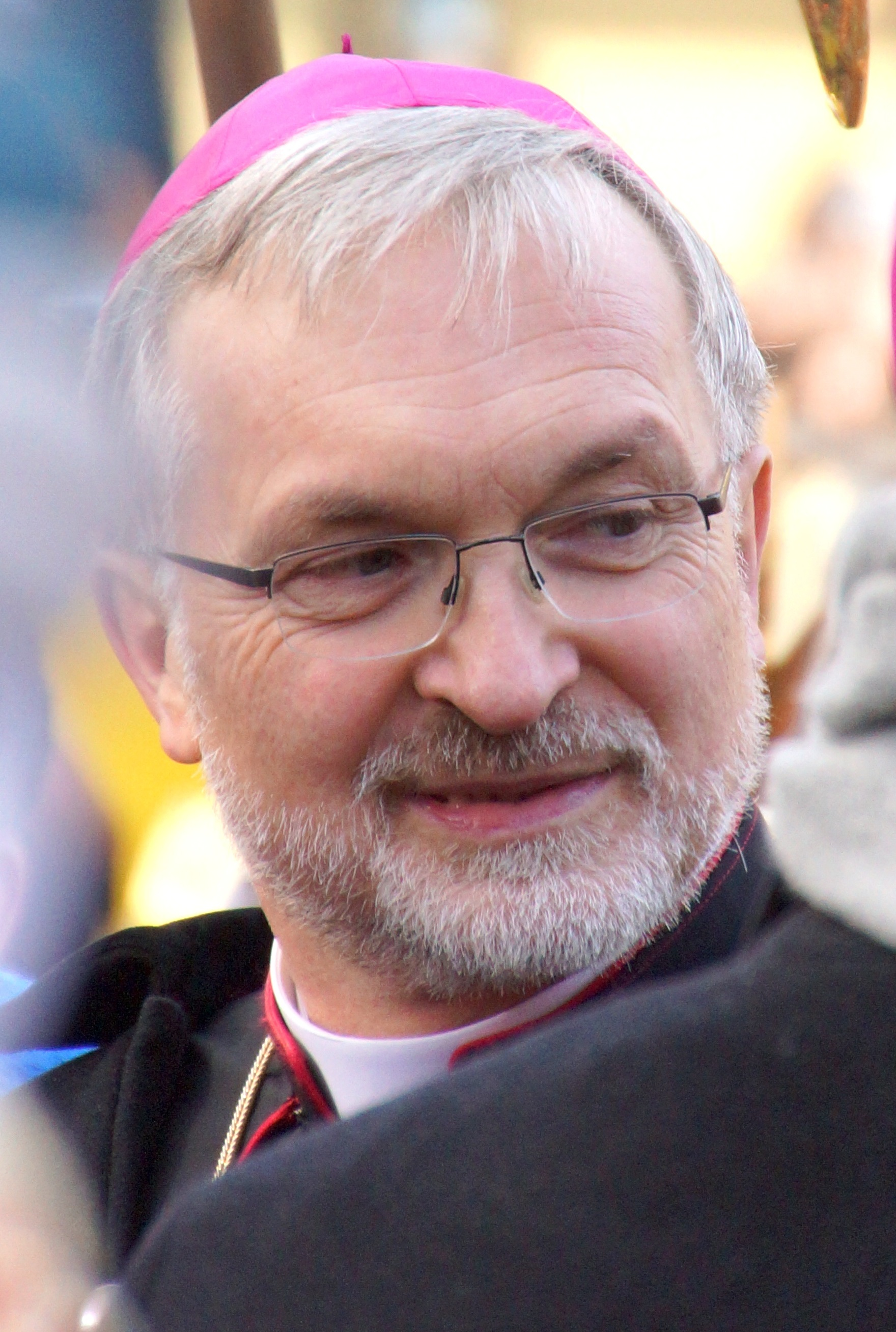
- Hanke in 2016
- Church: Catholic Church
- Diocese: Eichstätt
- Appointed: 14 October 2006
- Retired: 8 June 2025
- Predecessor: Walter Mixa
- Successor: Christian Würtz
- Previous post: Abbot of Plankstetten Abbey (1993–2006)

Orders
- Ordination: 10 September 1983 by Alois Brems
- Consecration: 2 December 2006 by Ludwig Schick

Personal details
- Born: Franz Maria Hanke; 2 July 1954 (age 72)
- Motto: Fides Nostra Victoria (Faith is our Victory)
- Signature: Gregor Maria Hanke's signature

- Coat of arms: Gregor Maria Hanke's coat of arms

Gregor Maria Hanke OSB (born 2 July 1954 as Franz Maria Hanke) is a German prelate of the Catholic Church who was the bishop of Eichstätt from 2006 to 2025. A member of the Benedictines, he was abbot of Plankstetten Abbey from 1993 to 2006.

== Early life ==
Franz Hanke, a teacher, and his wife Elisabeth lived in the Troppau district in the Sudetenland until 1946 when they were expelled and settled in Middle Franconia with their three sons and two daughters. Their last child, Franz Maria Hanke, was born on 2 July 1954 in Elbersroth. Two of his elder brothers became priests.

He graduated from the Willibald-Gymnasium in Eichstätt in 1974 and then entered the diocesan seminary, studying in London for the academic year 1976/77. He earned a diploma in theology at the Catholic University of Eichstätt in 1980, and next taught religion for the year 1980/81 at a vocational school in Roth.

In 1981 he entered the Benedictine Abbey of Plankstetten and received the religious name Gregor Maria after Gregory of Nyssa. He took his final vows as a Benedictine on 10 October 1982 He studied English in Eichstätt for the next year, was ordained a priest on 10 September 1983 by Bishop Alois Brems, and then studied English at Oxford from 1983 to 1985. He then returned to his abbey and managed guest services and the education center for five years.

He spent the year 1990/91 at the Pontifical Oriental Institute in Rome. On 13 July 1993, Hanke was elected abbot of Plankstetten Abbey; he took office on 2 October 1993.

In 2002 he obtained his doctorate from the School of Philosophy and Theology Sankt Georgen in Frankfurt am Main. His doctoral thesis examined the liturgy of the hours of Hagia Sophia in Constantinople.

== Bishop ==
Pope Benedict XVI appointed him bishop of Eichstätt on 14 October 2006. On 2 December he received his episcopal consecration from Ludwig Schick, archbishop of Bamberg, and was installed.

As Bishop of Eichstätt, Hanke was ex officio Grand Chancellor and Chairman of the Board of Trustees of the Catholic University of Eichstätt-Ingolstadt. After several years of conflict with its leadership, the crisis was resolved by ending Hanke's role and, as of October 2010, assigning those roles to the head of the Freising Bishops Conference. (Note: "Hanke throws the chancellor out and refuses to appoint the elected president, Ulrich Hemel. A little later, he hands over responsibility for the university.")

Hanke took part in the Synod of Bishops from 5 to 26 October 2008 in Rome as one of three delegates of the German Bishops Conference. The German-speaking working group chose him as their moderator. Pope Benedict XVI also named him to the Middle East Synod from 10 to 24 October 2010. He was a member of the Commission for Spiritual Professions and Church Services and the Commission for Marriage and Family of the German Bishops Conference, as well as Chairman of the Board of Directors and the Association Committee of the Association of German Diocese.

On 29 March 2014, Pope Francis named him a member of the Congregation for Institutes of Consecrated Life and for Societies of Apostolic Life.

Pope Leo XIV accepted his resignation on 8 June 2025. Pope Francis had accepted it in May without setting a date for it to take effect. Hanke said he wants to return to pastoral work outside the diocese, eschewing his bishop's insignia and title, and eventually return to monastic life.

== Selected writings ==
- Der Odenkanon des Tagzeitenritus Konstantinopels im Licht der Beiträge H. Schneiders und O. Strunks – eine Relecture; in: Hans-Jürgen Feulner, Elena Velkovska, Robert F. Taft S.J. (ed.): Crossroad of Cultures. Studies in Liturgy and Patristics in Honor of Gabriele Winkler; Orientalia Christiana Analecta, 260; Pont. Ist. Orient, Rome, 2000; p. 345–367.
- Vesper und Orthros des Kathedralritus der Hagia Sophia zu Konstantinopel: eine strukturanalytische und entwicklungsgeschichtliche Untersuchung unter besonderer Berücksichtigung der Psalmodie und der Formulare in den Euchologien (Jerusalemer Theologisches Forum 21,1–2), Aschendorff, Münster 2018, ISBN 978-3-402-11041-6
- Projekt Netzwerk Umwelt: Erarbeitung und Präsentation einer Umweltausstellung zum Thema „Glauben und Handeln“ in der Benediktinerabtei Plankstetten; Berching, 2004.
- Achtsam-Genügsam-Nachhaltig: Benedikt und Ökologie; in: Notker Wolf (ed.): Die Botschaft Benedikts; Münsterschwarzach, 2008.
