= Interventional neuroradiology =

Subspecialty of neurology

Interventional neuroradiology (INR), also known as neurointerventional surgery (NIS), endovascular therapy (EVT), endovascular neurosurgery, and interventional neurology, is an emerging and dynamic medical subspecialty of neurosurgery, neuroradiology, Interventional radiology and neurology, specializing in minimally invasive image-based technologies and procedures used in diagnosis and treatment of diseases of the head, neck, and spine.

== History ==
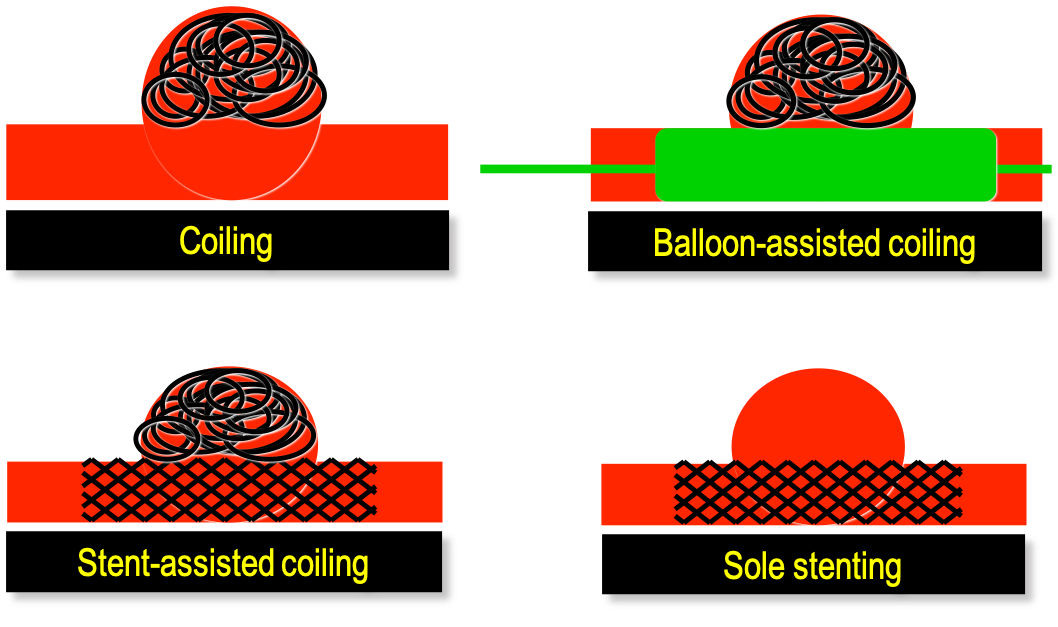
Endovascular modalities for intracranial aneurysms

Diagnostic angiography

Cerebral angiography was developed by Portuguese neurologist Egas Moniz at the University of Lisbon, in order to identify central nervous system diseases such as tumors or arteriovenous malformations. He performed the first brain angiography in Lisbon in 1927 by injecting an iodinated contrast medium into the internal carotid artery and using the X-rays discovered 30 years earlier by Roentgen in order to visualize the cerebral vessels. In pre-CT and pre-MRI, it was the only tool to observe the structures within the skull and was also used to diagnose extravascular pathologies.

Subsequently, European radiologists further developed the angiographic technique by replacing the traumatic direct puncture with catheterization: in 1953, Swedish physician Sven Seldinger introduced the technique of arterial and venous catheterization still in practice, dubbed the Seldinger technique. In 1964, the Norwegian radiologist Per Amudsen was the first to perform a complete brain angiography with a transfemoral approach, as it is performed today; he then moved to San Francisco to teach the technique to American neuroradiologists. These two stages, at the basis of modern invasive vascular diagnostics, prepared the way for later therapeutic developments.

The first treatments: balloon occlusion

The first to carry out a true endovascular procedure was Charles Dotter, the father of angioplasty and considered by many as the father of all interventional radiology, as well as the first doctor to have performed endovascular treatment. On January 16, 1964, he performed a therapeutic angioplasty of a superficial femoral artery in an 82-year-old woman with an ischemic leg refusing amputation. The artery remained open for the next two and a half years, after which the woman died of pneumonia.

The concept of using balloons to treat cerebrovascular lesions was inspired by a 1959 May Day celebration in Moscow’s Red Square. While watching children use tether lines to manipulate helium balloons, Fedor Serbinenko, a Russian neurosurgeon, began to envision small balloons moving through tortuous arteries. In the 1970s Fedor Serbinenko developed a technique for closing intracranial aneurysms with balloons that were released into the internal carotid artery by occluding the lumen. The first treatment was performed in 1970 in Moscow, with the occlusion of an internal carotid to treat a carotid-cavernous fistula. He can be considered, therefore, the first interventional neuroradiologist. This technique was subsequently refined by neuroradiologists all over the world and mainly in France, where interventional neuroradiology developed and flourished.

Parallel to the development of catheters, in the radiology and neuroradiology units, image technology dramatically improved: Charles Mistretta in 1979 invented digital subtraction angiography (DSA), the technique currently in use. It consists of performing skull radiography under basic conditions which are then "subtracted" to the image after contrast media injection, to provide an image where only brain vessels are displayed, with great improvement in the diagnostic potential.

Coils replace balloon occlusion

Between the end of the 1980s and the beginning of the '90s, INR was suddenly revolutionized after the work of two Italian physicians: Cesare Gianturco and Guido Guglielmi. The first combined a deep knowledge of diagnostic radiology with a great ability to solve technical and manual problems. He invented Gianturco's coils, which he used to make the first attempts to embolize arteries and aneurysms. Gianturco also patented the first endovascular stent approved by the American FDA; a device with a great legacy. In the second half of the 1980s, Sadek Hilal was the first in Columbia University to use coils to treat brain aneurysms; but this technique was inaccurate and dangerous because the coils were released with little control with great risk of occluding the vessel from which the aneurysm originated (parent vessel). The coil embolization was revolutionized by the work of Guido Guglielmi in UCLA, who realized that electricity could function as a controlled release mechanism for coils; in 1991 he published two works dealing with the embolization of brain aneurysms by means of detachable platinum coils (Guglielmi's coils). The treatment of aneurysms was thus made more accessible and safe.

New techniques: Sole stenting and flow diversion stents

From the early 2000s, intracranial stents were used to prevent the coils inside the aneurysmal sac from protruding into the parent artery. Flow diversion devices were later developed, with the function of reconstructing the vessel's normal anatomy without directly closing the aneurysm neck and therefore preserving side branches and preventing ischemia. The sole stenting procedure involves the insertion of a stent only (without any coils) into the vessel that has an aneurysm.

Not just hemorrhages: the treatment of ischemic stroke

The Souers Stroke Institute was founded in 1991 at Saint Louis University, and its first director, Camilo R. Gomez, M.D., is often credited with founding interventional neurology as a subspecialty in the United States.

Between January and June 2015, five major randomized trials were published in the New England Journal of Medicine (NEJM) with the collaboration of interventional neuroradiologists and stroke neurologists (in the Netherlands, Canada, Australia, US and Spain) regarding the role of mechanical thrombectomy in the treatment of ischemic stroke, demonstrating that if it is performed in centers with proven experience, intra-arterial mechanical thrombectomy is more effective than traditional treatment (intravenous thrombolytic injection). The promising results of these mechanical thrombectomy trials were highlighted by the NEJM in an editorial, which concluded with the statement: "Endovascular equipoise no longer exists. It's about time."

Thrombectomy is currently recommended by the guidelines written by the main American (AHA/ASA) and European (ESO-ESNR-ESMINT) societies of stroke neurologists and interventional neuroradiologists.

== Diseases and conditions ==
Endovascular repair of cerebral aneurysm

Intra-cranial angioplasty and stent of basilar artery stenosis

The following is a list of diseases and conditions typically treated by neurointerventionalists.

- Cerebral aneurysm
- Brain arteriovenous malformation (AVM)
- Carotid-cavernous fistula (CCF)
- Dural arteriovenous fistula
- Extracranial (brachiocephalic) atherosclerosis
- Extracranial (head and neck) and paraspinal vascular malformations
- Head and neck tumors
- Intracranial atherosclerosis
- Juvenile nasopharyngeal tumor
- Meningiomas
- Nosebleeds
- Paragangliomas
- Stroke
- Spinal vascular malformations
- Traumatic vascular lesions
- Vasospasm
- Vertebral body tumors
- Vertebral body compression fractures

== See also ==
- Stroke
- Intracranial aneurysm
- Interventional radiology
- Neurosurgery
