= Thrombectomy =

Removal of a blood clot from a blood vessel

Removal of a blood clot (top) using an intra-arterial mesh retriever and suction

Mechanical thrombectomy, or simply thrombectomy, is the removal of a blood clot (thrombus) from a blood vessel, often and especially endovascularly as an interventional radiology procedure called endovascular thrombectomy. It contrasts with thrombolysis (clot dissolution) by thrombolytic medications (e.g., alteplase, reteplase), as either an alternative or complement.

Thrombectomy is commonly performed in the cerebral arteries as treatment to reverse the ischemia in some ischemic strokes (i.e., those in which the blockage is a suitable candidate for such retrieval). Open vascular surgery versions of thrombectomy also exist. The effectiveness of thrombectomy for strokes was confirmed in clinical research conducted in 2015.

== Applications in brain ==
Mechanical thrombectomy can be used to remove blood clots from the brain. An interventional neuroradiology procedure uses an aspiration catheter inserted through the groin to apply a retriever, or, in some cases, suction, to capture and remove the clot.

Mechanical thrombectomy can be used within 24 hours after the stroke has occurred. It is the standard of care for large vessel occlusions, with studies showing a significant increase in functionality compared to medication without intervention.

=== History ===
Early endovascular treatments (Intra-arterial thrombolysis) released of clot-dissolving pro-urokinase through a catheter in proximity to the clot. They did not have sufficient benefits compared to alternative treatments, caused complications such as intracranial haemorrhage, and never received FDA approval for this indication. In response, multiple new devices were developed, with MERCI Retriever showing early success with using a wire to ensnare and pull out the thrombus. Later, Penumbra System, which used clot debulking and mechanical retrieval as a backup, was introduced, with a study showing that it was comparable to MERCI. However, both had limited clinical benefits.

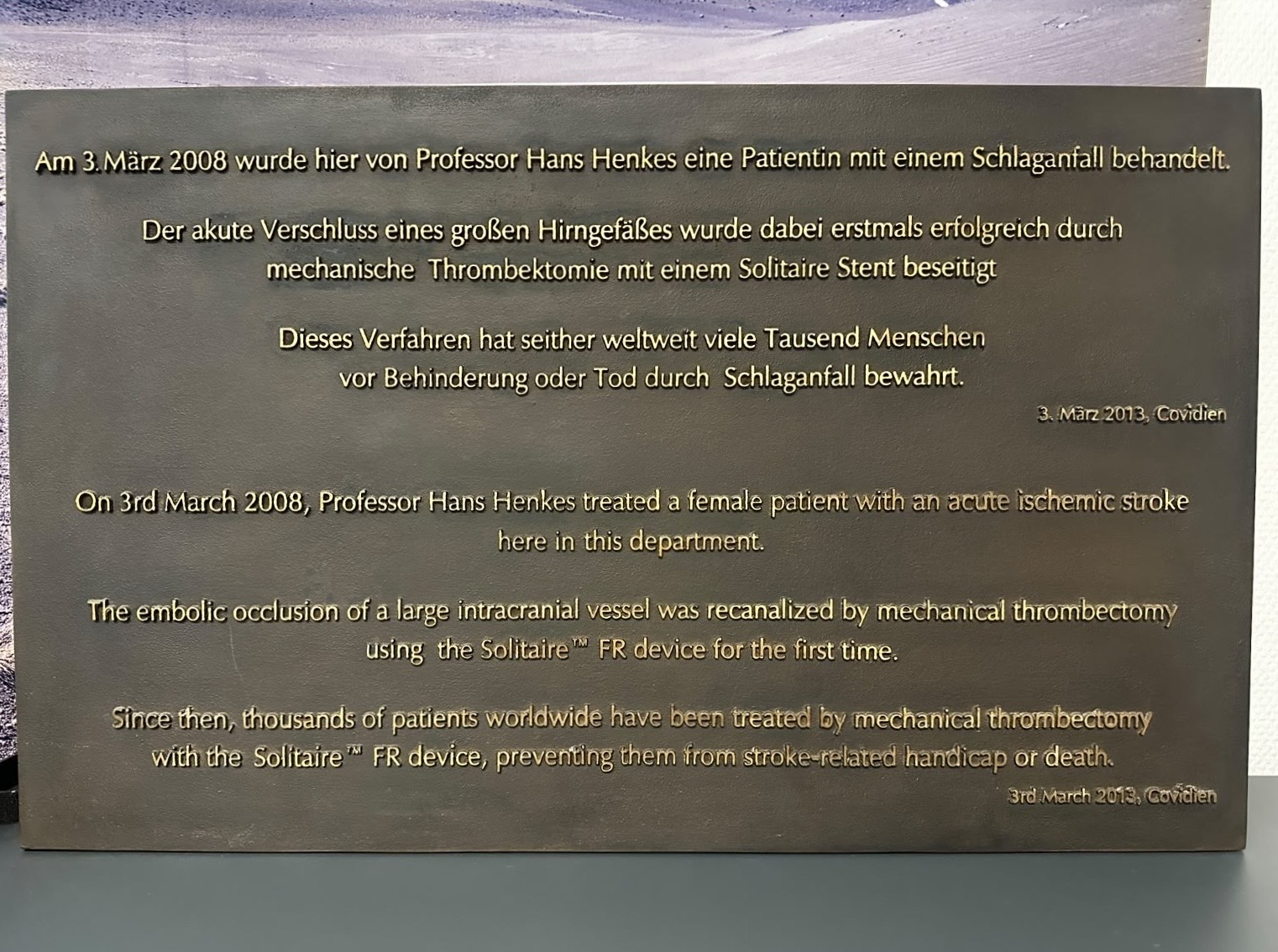
Commemorative plaque for the first successful stent-retriever thrombectomy, performed by Hans Henkes at Klinikum Stuttgart (2008)

In the late 2000s, the use of stent retrievers for intracranial thrombectomy began. A retrievable stent for thrombus and foreign material removal was reported in 2003. The first successful stent retriever thrombectomy was performed in 2008 with a Solitaire stent, which was approved to treat aneurysms and used off-label because other treatments were unsuitable, unavailable, or had already failed. Solitaire FR and Trevo Retriever were developed in the aftermath, with trials following soon after. Both new devices were shown to be superior.

Early trials called Synthesis, MR Rescue, and IMS III were published in 2013, with none of them showing clear clinical benefits.

Later research indicated that issues with patient selection, the use of less effective or older devices, and slow workflows may have adversely affected outcomes. Starting in 2015, multiple studies confirmed the viability of the treatment due to a significant improvement in outcomes after mechanical thrombectomy compared to medical intervention alone. Studies also extended the evidence for positive outcomes beyond six hours after clinical onset, while some other studies showed benefits for people in higher-risk groups, and for specific kinds of strokes.

=== Basilar artery occlusion ===
For people with basilar artery occlusion, thrombectomy improved outcomes with good functionality from 23% to 46%, and reduced mortality from 55% to 37%. A 2024 study confirmed a significant decrease in death and disability as well as an improvement in quality of life.

Potential complications can occur within and outside the head. Complications outside the head (extracranial) include dissection and vasospasm, and intracranial dissection, vasospasm, stenosis, and embolization can also occur. There does not seem to be a significant increase in complications in treatments that occur multiple hours after the stroke.

== See also ==
- Stroke
- Embolectomy
- Pulmonary thromboendarterectomy
