= Reichersberg Abbey =

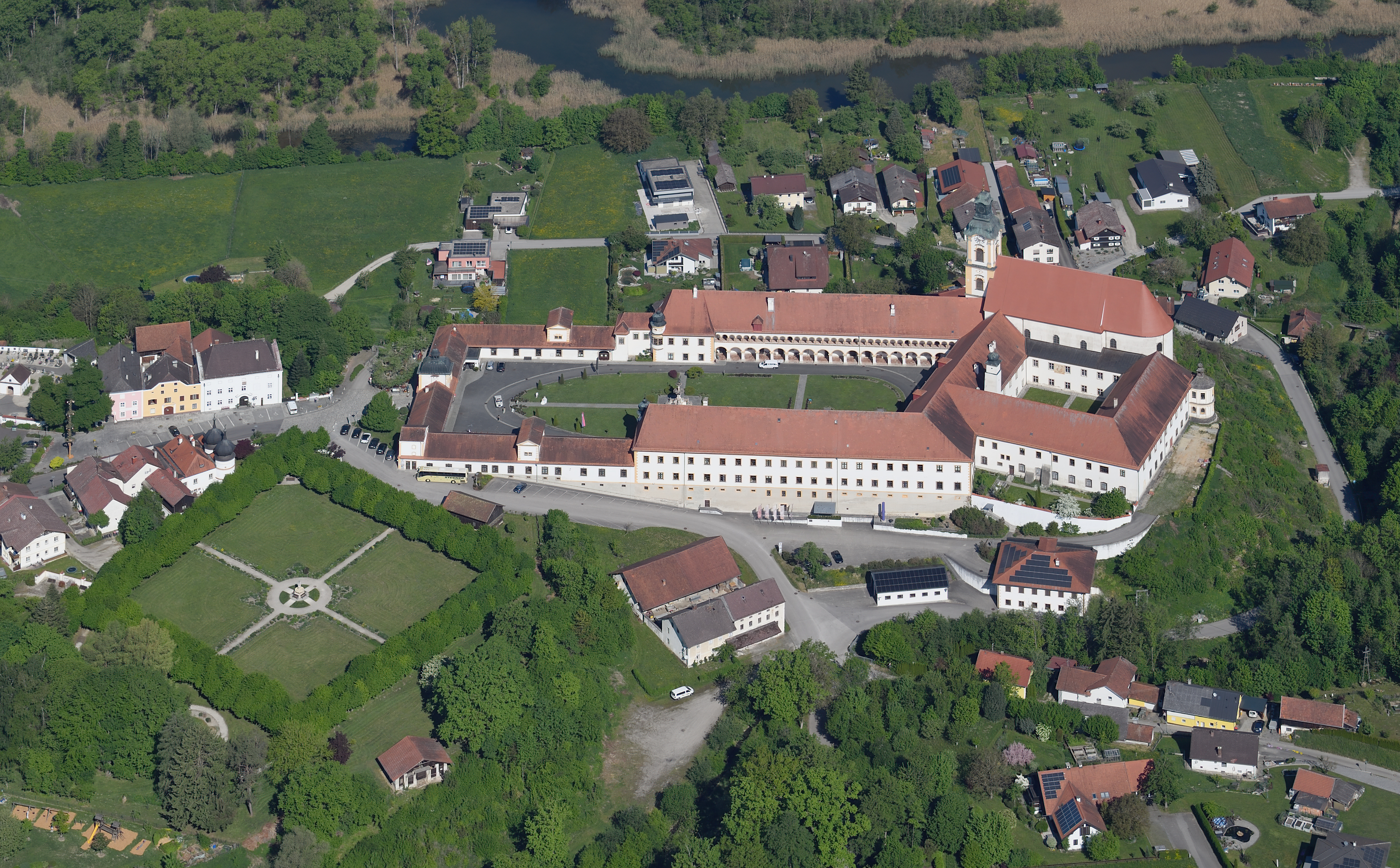
- Aerial view of the abbey and its garden

- Location within Austria
- Interactive map of Reichersberg Abbey

Monastery information
- Order: Augustinian Canons Regular
- Established: 1084

Architecture
- Functional status: In use

Site
- Coordinates: 48.337093°N 13.360388°E

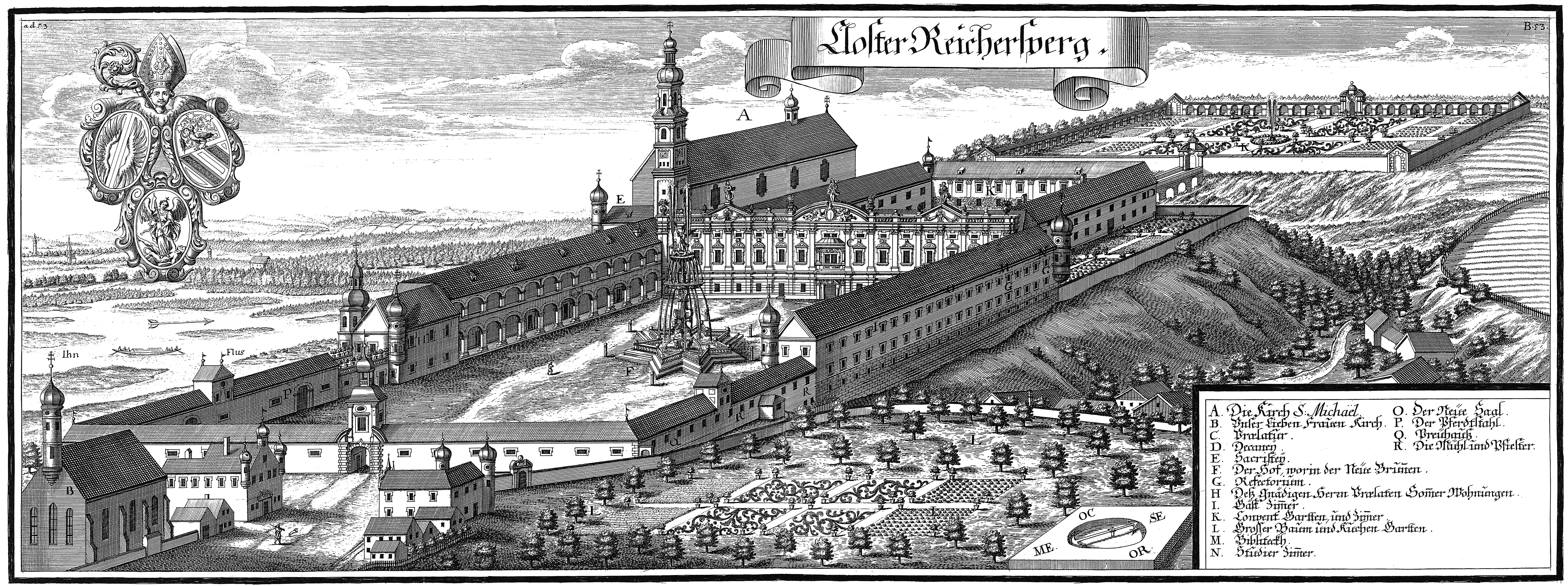
View of the abbey by Michael Wening, published in 1721

Reichersberg Abbey (German: Stift Reichersberg) is a monastery of the Innviertel Congregation of the Austrian Augustinian Canons. It lies on the Inn River in Reichersberg, Upper Austria.

== History ==
=== Original monastery ===
The nobleman Wernher von Reichersberg converted his possessions into a monastery in the 11th century. It has been owned by Augustinian Canons since then. Wernher and his wife Dietburga donated their castle to the canons regular for use as a monastery in 1084 after their only son Gebhard died young. In the first few decades of its existence the monastery went through several changes of hands. Although the monastery lay within the diocese of Passau, it became the property of the diocese of Salzburg. The Archbishop Conrad I of Salzburg, who "tolerated no hireling or dissolute priests", appointed the like-minded Gerhoh provost of the monastery in 1132. Conrad gave various tithes to Reichersberg, "except for the canonical portion of the parish priests". He reserved the right to dispose of the priest's portion to avoid disputes with the canons.

The monastery flourished under the guidance of Gerhoh, the third Provost and an eminent theologian. While there, Gerhoh composed his commentary on the Psalms between 1144 and 1148, making much use of the earlier work of Gilbert of Poitiers. When Gerhoh wrote his Inquiry into the Antichrist in 1162, he had been provost of Reichersberg for thirty years. Gerhoh died in 1169. His successor Arno, also a distinguished scholar, died in 1175. Arno was the brother of Gerhoh, and author of Scutum Canonicorum Regularium and other works. Gerhoh's pupil, Magnus, wrote a history of the abbey from 1167 to 1195.

The archbishop of Salzburg gave the abbey a pastoral area on what was then the Hungarian border, where the canons are active to this day. In the mid 16th century master Ulrich Lufftenecker became a teacher at the monastery, and taught students choral singing. Four printed choir books have survived from the second half of the 16th century.

=== Later history ===
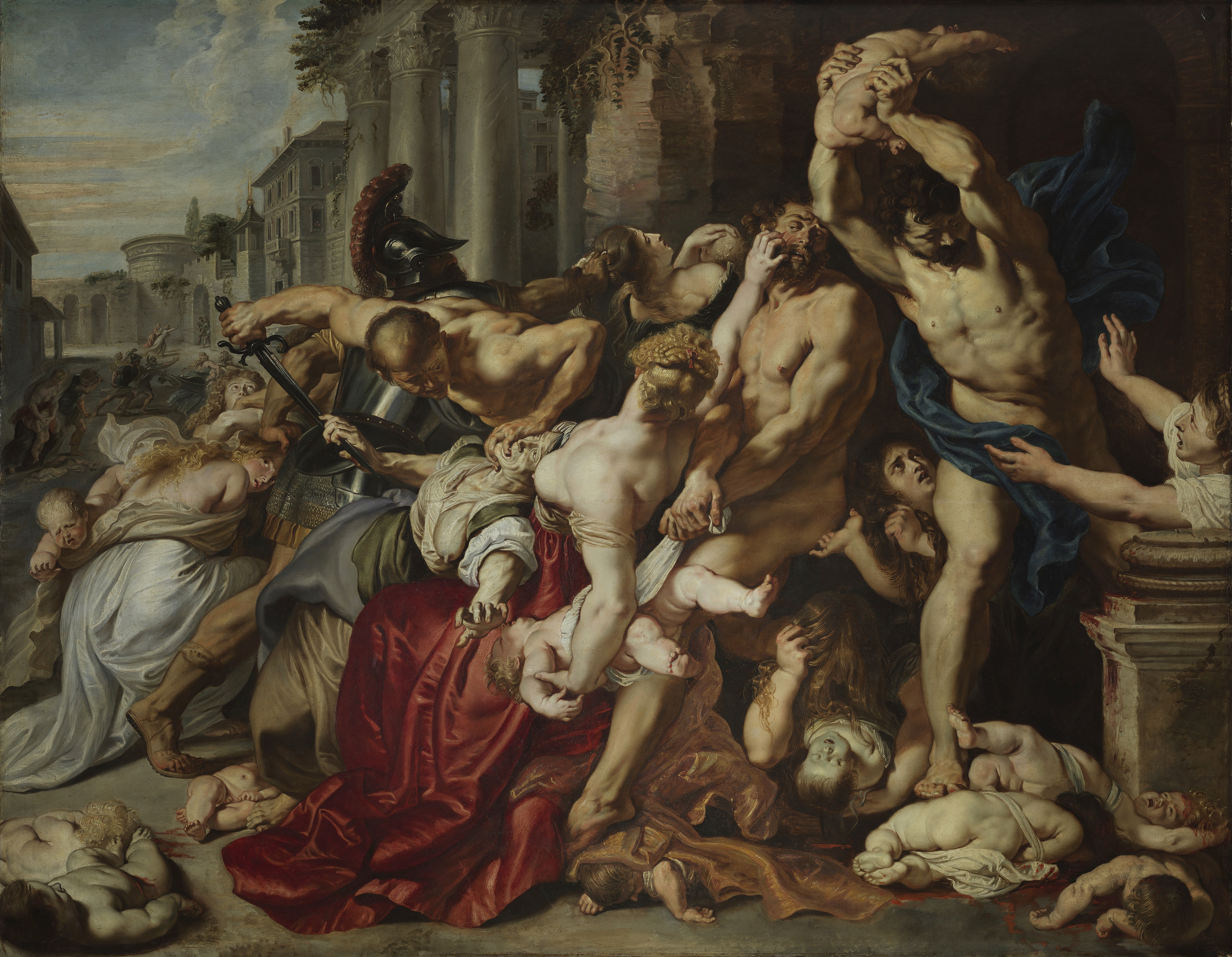
The Massacre of the Innocents by Peter Paul Rubens was exhibited at the monastery for many years until the artist was identified.

The original monastery was relatively small, built in Romanesque-Gothic style. In 1624 it was destroyed by a fire. During the years that followed a large baroque replacement was erected. These buildings stand today. A new organ was made by A. Butz in 1638. It was destroyed in 1774 by collapse of the tower in which it was installed. The outer courtyard of the monastery has a marble fountain crowned with a figure of St. Michael, the patron of the monastery, made by Thomas Schwanthaler. The Munich court painter Christian Wink completed the frescoes of the church in 1778-79. The monastery holds the work of other artists including Josef Matthias Götz, Franz Ignaz Holzinger and Giovanni Battista Carlone.

In 1779 the monastery was assigned to Austria and thus escaped the secularization of Bavarian monasteries. During the Napoleonic Wars it had to struggle for its existence. In 1810 the monastery was placed under administration. Normal monastic activities resumed in 1817. In 1883 the collegiate church organ was widened following the plans of organist J. E. Habert. During World War II (1939-1945) the monastery was forced to provide a home for a flying school, but avoided being closed down.

== Today ==
As of 2013 there were about twenty canons at the abbey. The monastery has been renovated and is now a cultural center of the Innviertels. The monastery has an extensive library, holding 55,000 volumes. It holds a large collection of religious art, which can be viewed during guided tours. In 2002 a painting of the Massacre of the Innocents, which was on loan, was found to be a genuine Rubens. It was later sold for over €75 million. The monastery holds exhibitions, seminars and garden days. It has a shop, a wine shop and restaurant. There is accommodation for seminar attendees.

== Gallery ==
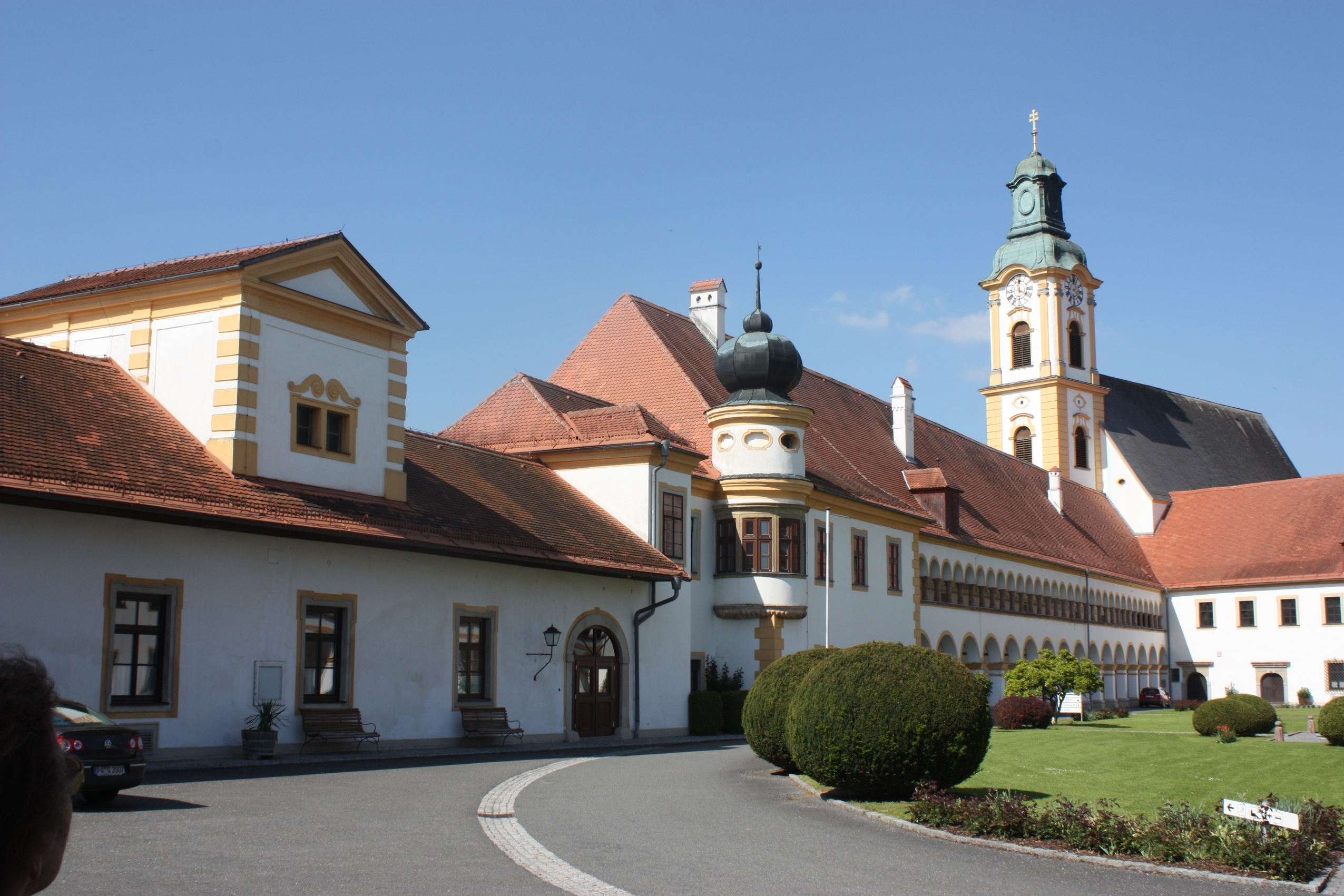
General view, in 2013

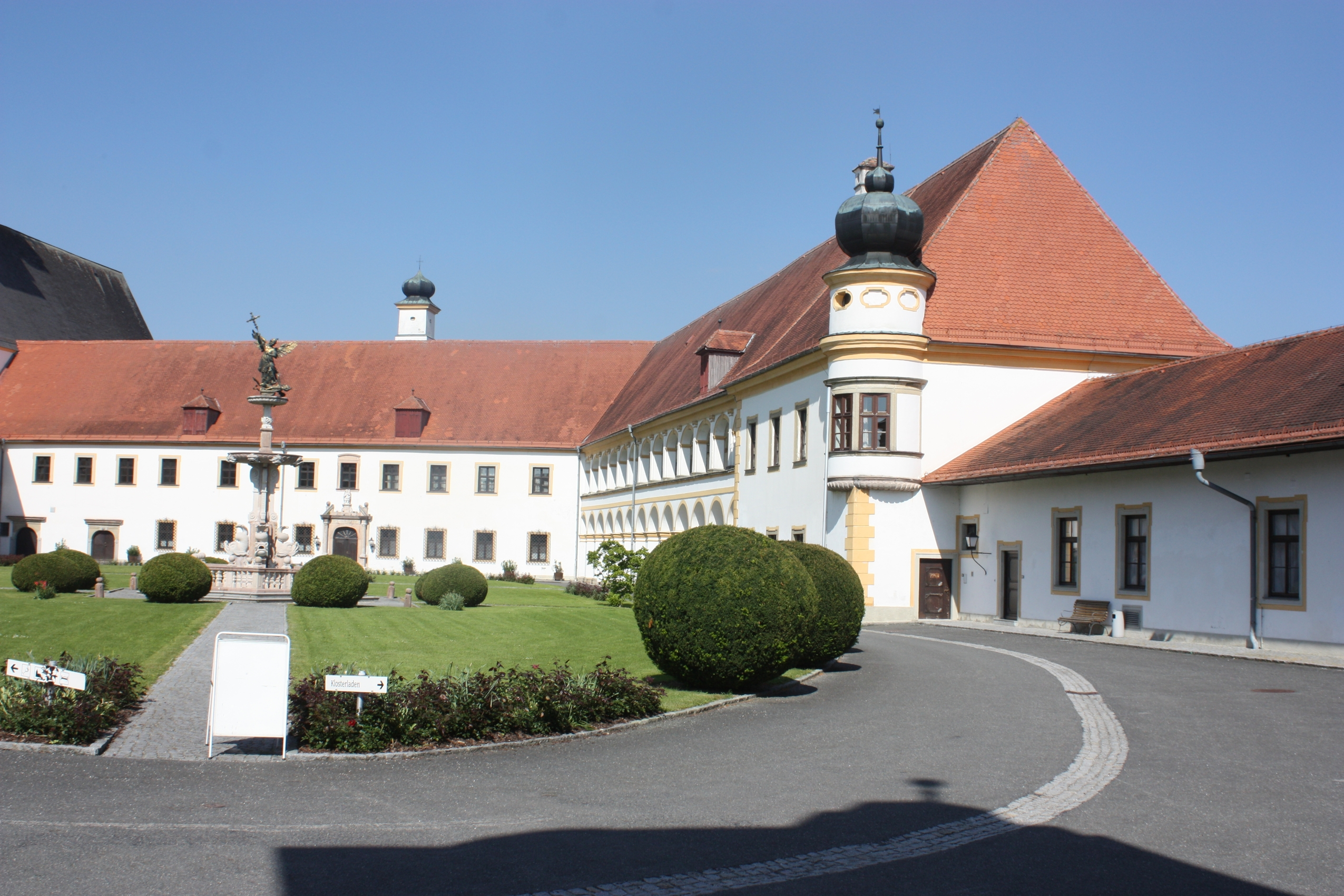
General view, in 2013

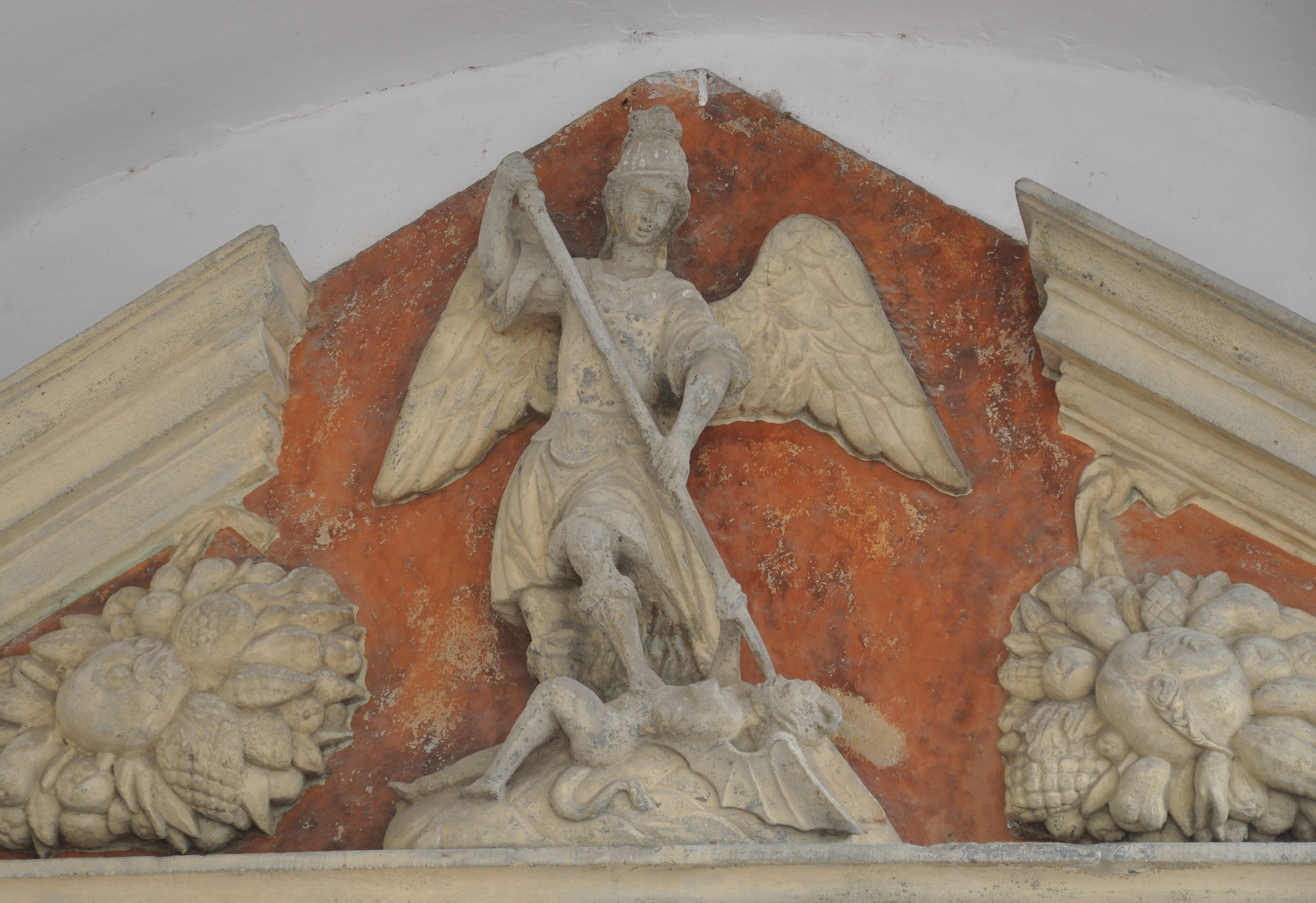
portal in the arcade

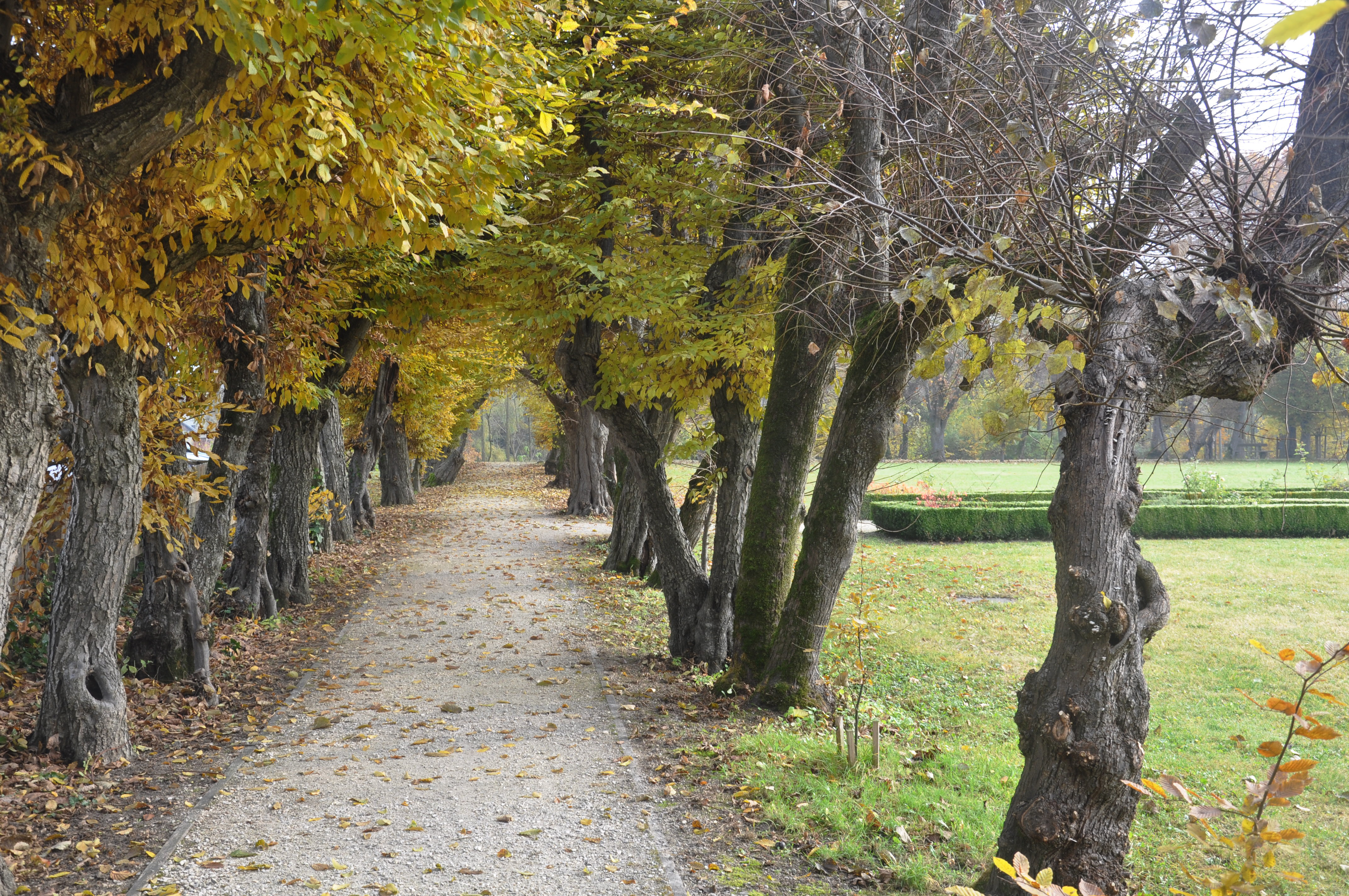
Garden
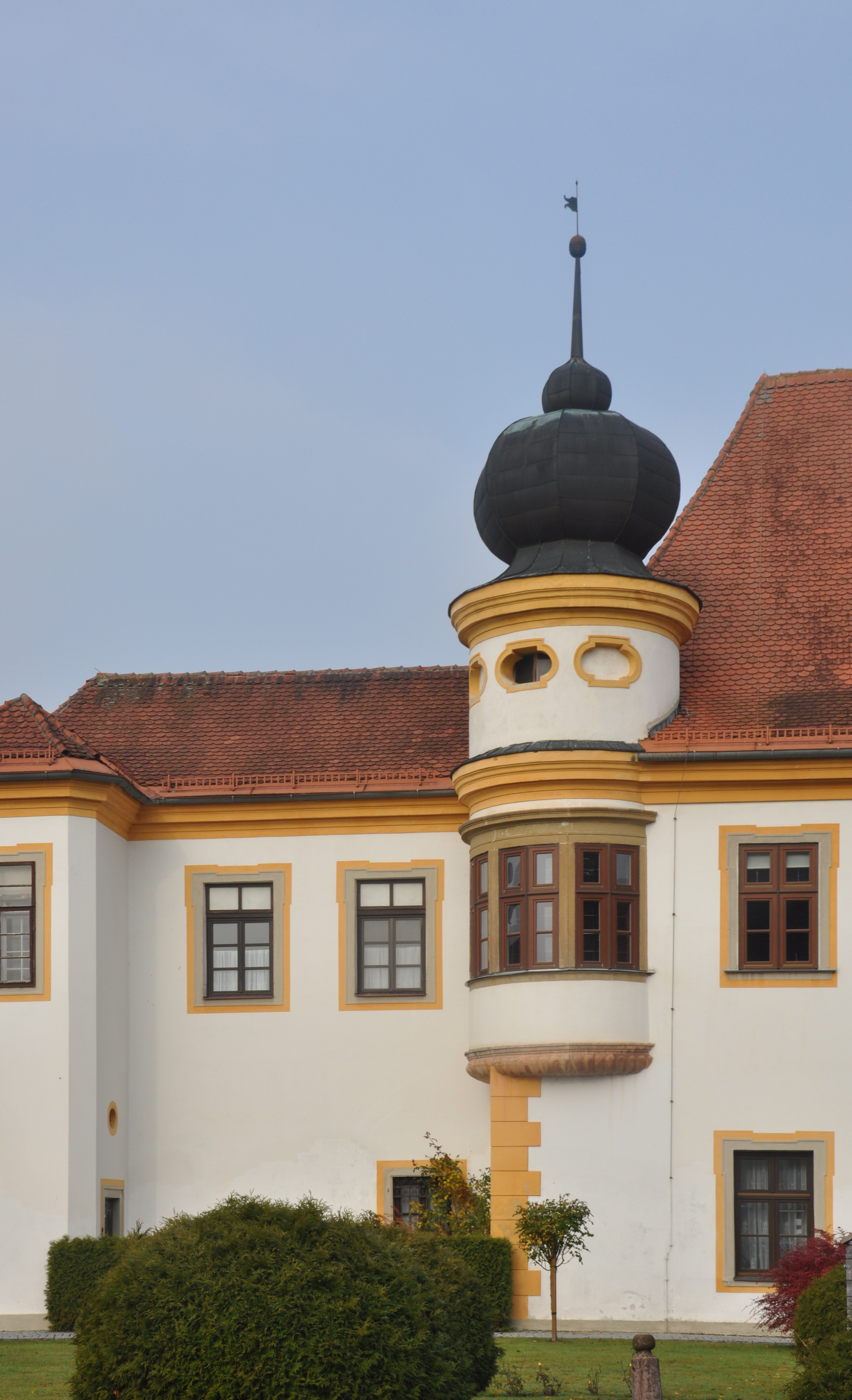
Turret

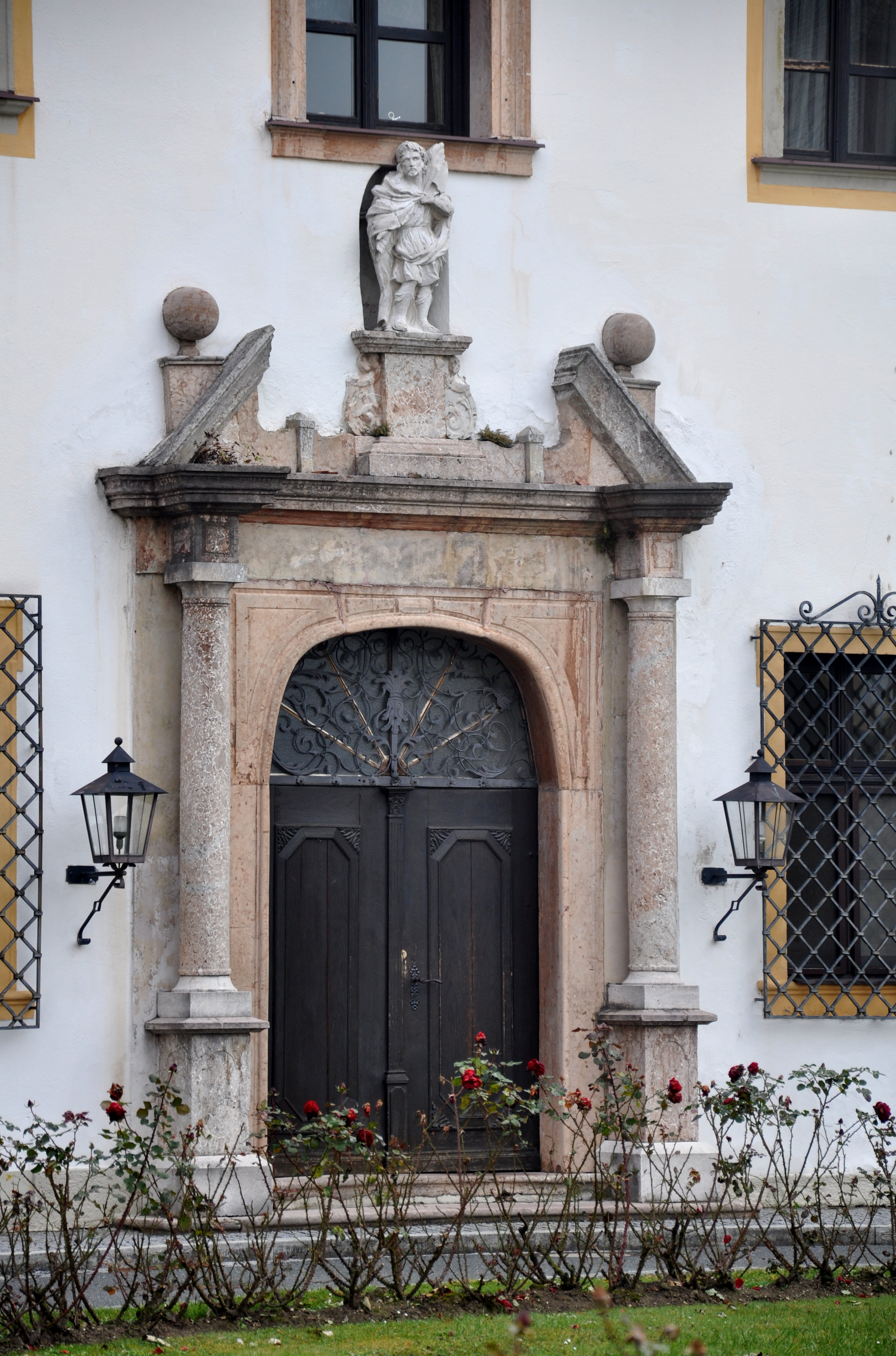
Portal

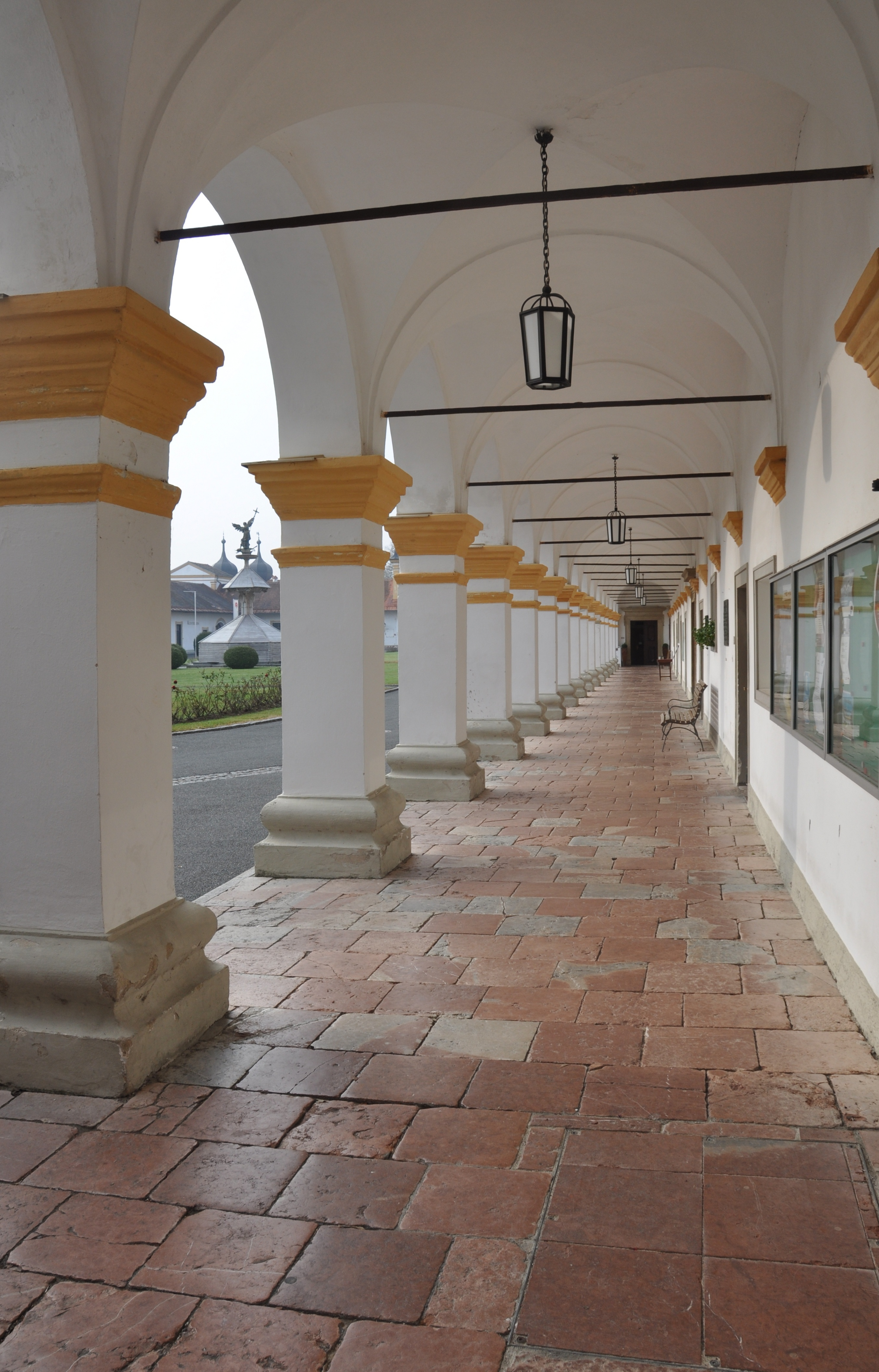
Arcade

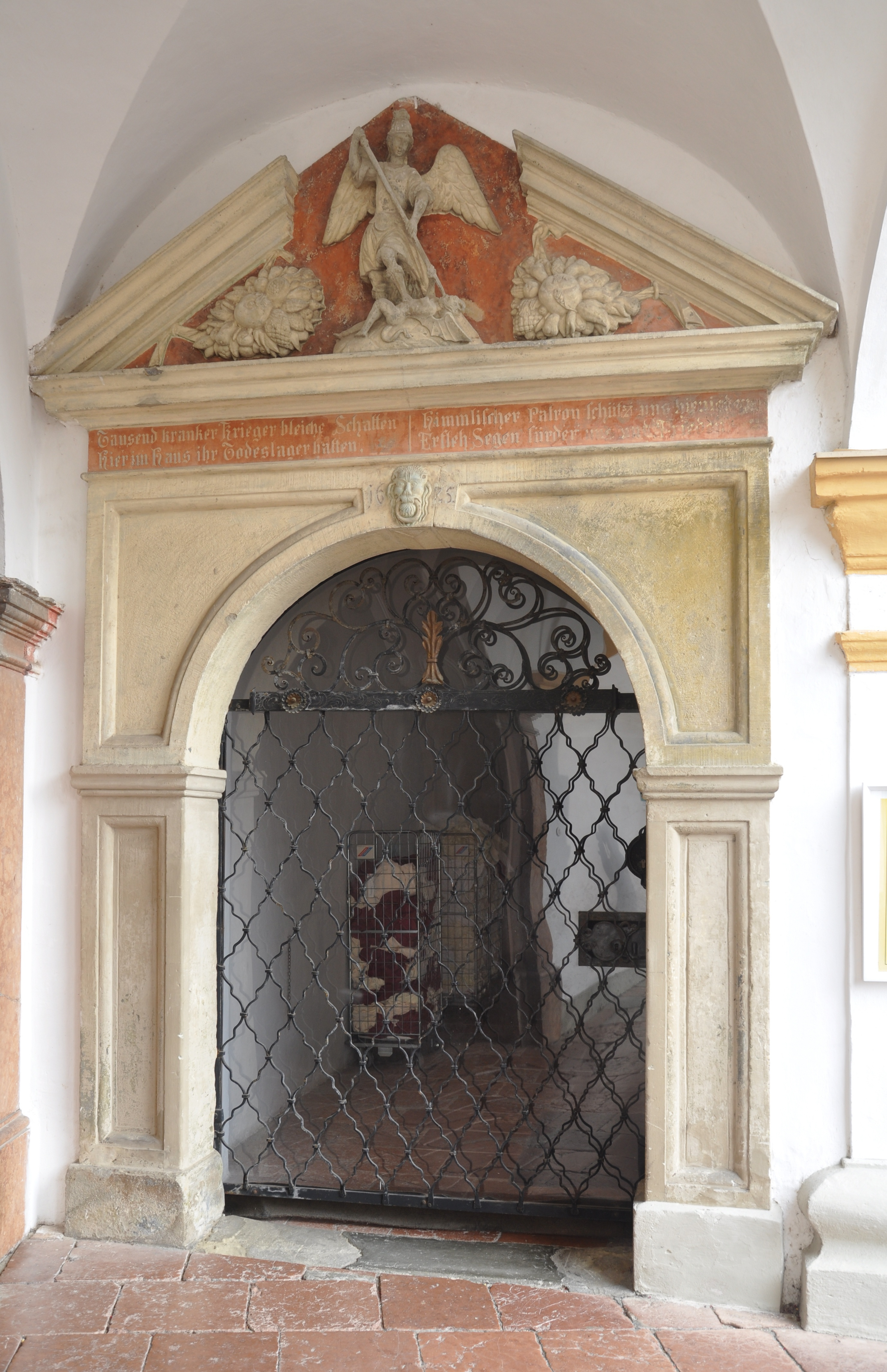
portal in the arcade

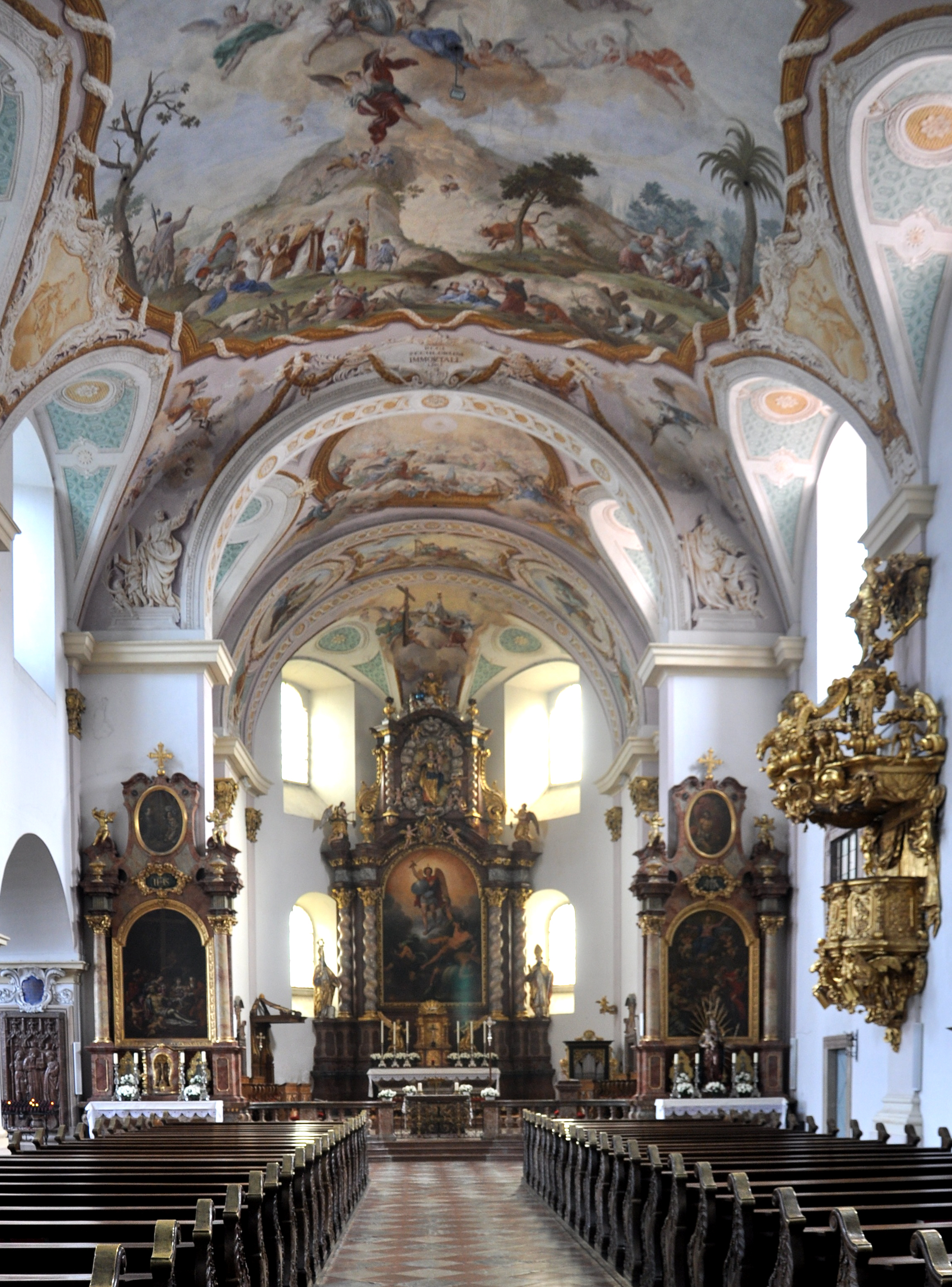
Church interior

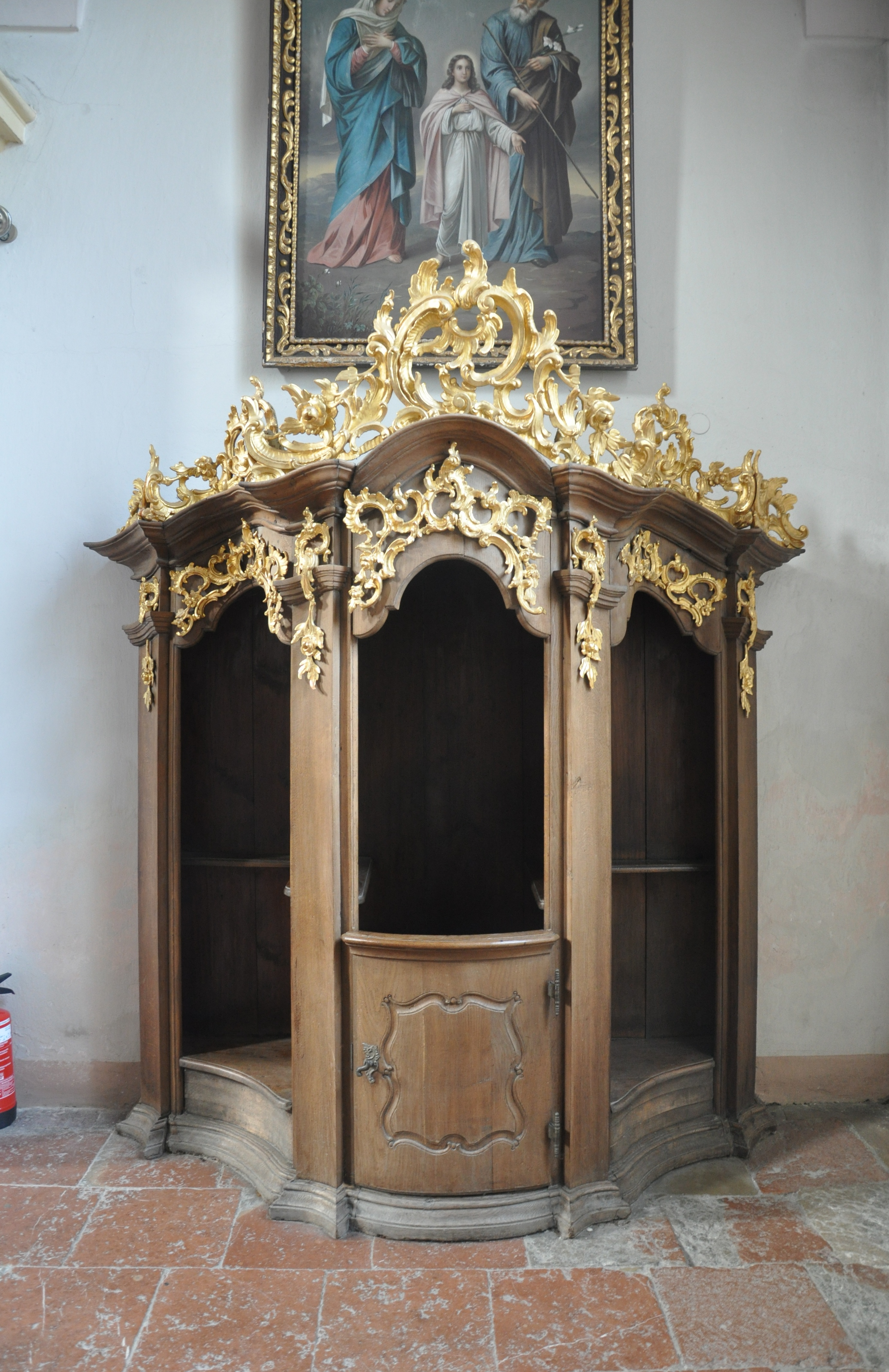
Confessional

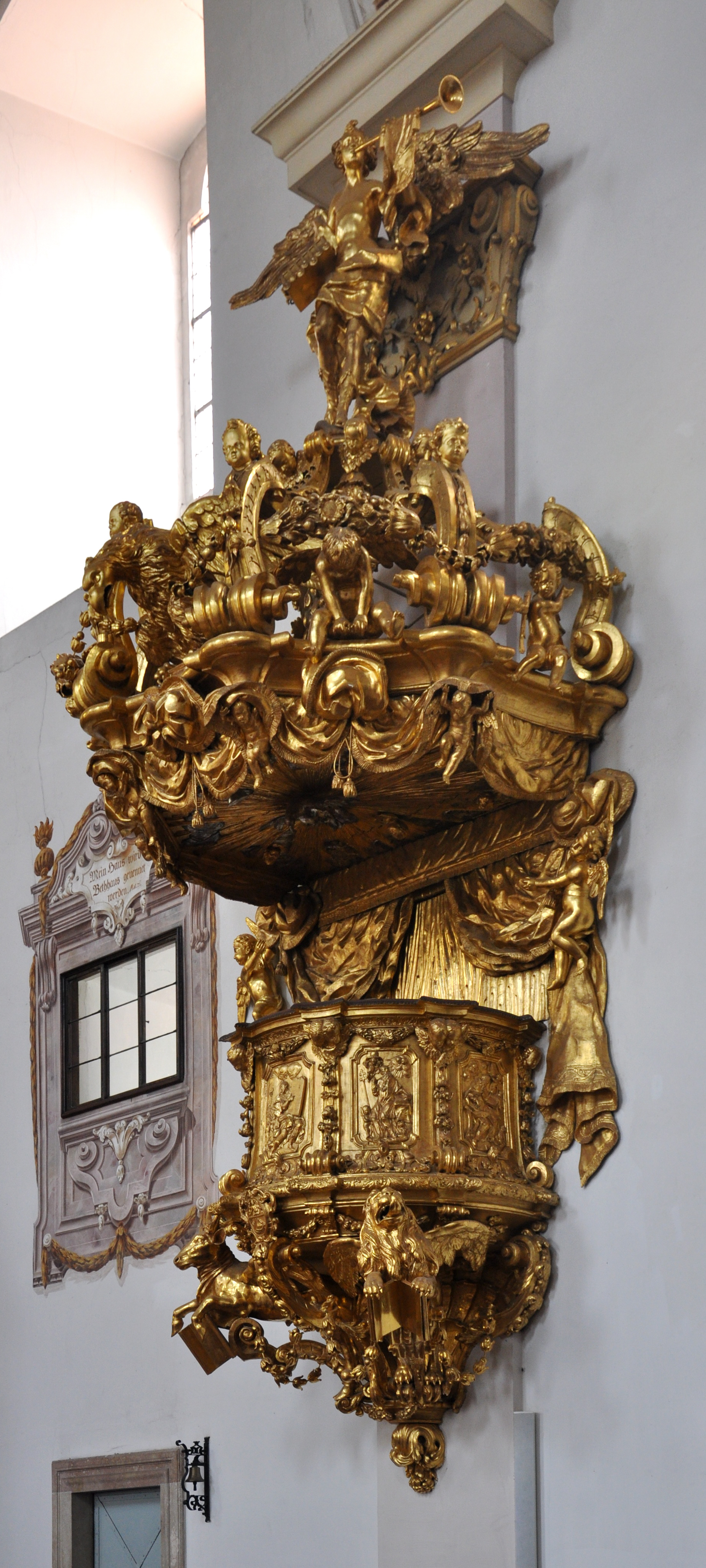
Pulpit, attributed to Joseph Matthias Götz, 1718

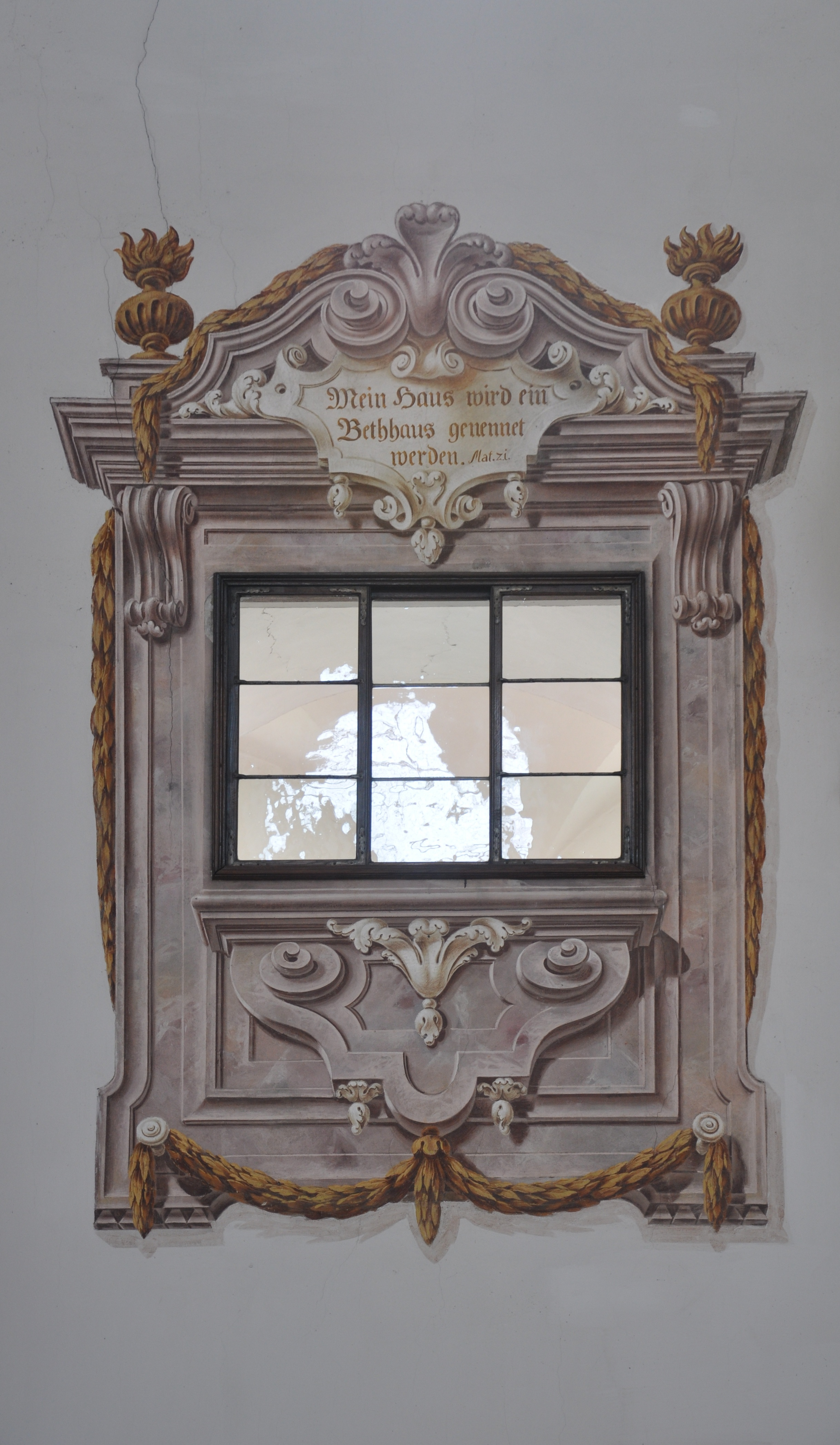
Trompe-l'œil painting of a window
