= Fritz Hemke =

American jazz musician

Fritz Hemke (né Frederic John Borg Hemke; born 1967) is an American saxophonist based in South Dakota. He is the son of saxophonist Frederick L. Hemke.

== Education ==
He studied saxophone while a student at New Trier Township High School in Winnetka, Illinois.

He received his bachelor and master of music degrees from Northwestern University.

== Teaching career ==
Hemke is on the faculty of Northern State University in Aberdeen, South Dakota, where he is the Jazz Ensemble director and assistant professor of applied woodwinds, woodwind methods, instrumental techniques.

Prior to joining the faculty at Northern, he served for ten years as Director of Jazz Performance Studies and saxophone instructor at the University of Missouri in Columbia.

He has taught saxophone at the Bemidji Arts Camp in Bemidji, Minnesota.

== Performing career ==
Hemke appeared as a soloist with the Wroclaw Philharmonic Orchestra and conductor Mariusz Smolij, where he premiered new music commissioned for him (Mark Engebretson's "Duo Concertante" for alto and tenor saxophones and orchestra.) He also premiered "Charlie's Dream Concerto", a piece for alto saxophone and orchestra by Marta Ptaszynska.

He has performed as a guest artist in many international venues including the International Festival of Music of Pará in Belém, Brazil.

He was a guest artist at the Athens International Jazz Festival and has taught as a visiting scholar in jazz at the Franz Liszt College of Music in Budapest, Hungary.
