= Peter Henkes =

German footballer

Personal information
- Date of birth: 27 July 1962 (age 64)
- Height: 1.80 m (5 ft 11 in)
- Position: Midfielder

Senior career*
Years	Team	Apps	(Gls)
1986–1993	FSV Salmrohr	24	(0)
- * Club domestic league appearances and goals

Peter Henkes (born 27 July 1962) is a German former professional footballer who played as a midfielder.

== Career ==
Henkes was capped 24 times for FSV Salmrohr in 1986–87 2. Bundesliga season. He won the 1989–90 German amateur football championship with FSV Salmrohr.
