= Henke =

Henke is a surname. Notable people with the surname include:

- Adolph Henke (1775–1843), German physician and pharmacologist known for his work in medical forensics
- Alfred Henke (1868-1946), German politician
- Brad William Henke (1966–2022), American actor and football player
- Ed Henke (1927–2015), former National Football League player
- Ernst Ludwig Theodor Henke (1804–1872), German historian
- Fritz Henke (1921–1999), World War II Waffen-SS soldier awarded the Knight's Cross of the Iron Cross
- Heinrich Philipp Konrad Henke (1752–1809), German theologian; father of Ernst Henke
- Holger Henke (born 1960), political scientist and former Vice Chancellor for Academic Affairs & Provost at Wenzhou-Kean University (China)
- Jana Henke (born 1973), German former swimmer
- Jonathan Henke (born 1974), American political blogger
- Karl Henke (general) (1896–1945), World War II German general
- Kevin Henke, American geochemist
- Michael Henke (born 1957), German football coach and former player
- Nolan Henke (born 1964), American golfer
- Rudolf Henke (born 1954), German politician
- Ruth Henke, British judge
- Thaddäus Haenke (1761–1816), Bohemian geographer and explorer in South America
- Tom Henke (born 1957), retired Major League Baseball relief pitcher
- Wayne J. Henke (born 1941), member of the Missouri House of Representatives
- Werner Henke (1909–1944), World War II German submarine commander

Fictional characters:

- Skezz Henke, in the HBO television drama Oz

== See also ==
- Hencke
- Hanke
- Henkes
- Henrik
