= Reichersberg =

- Municipality
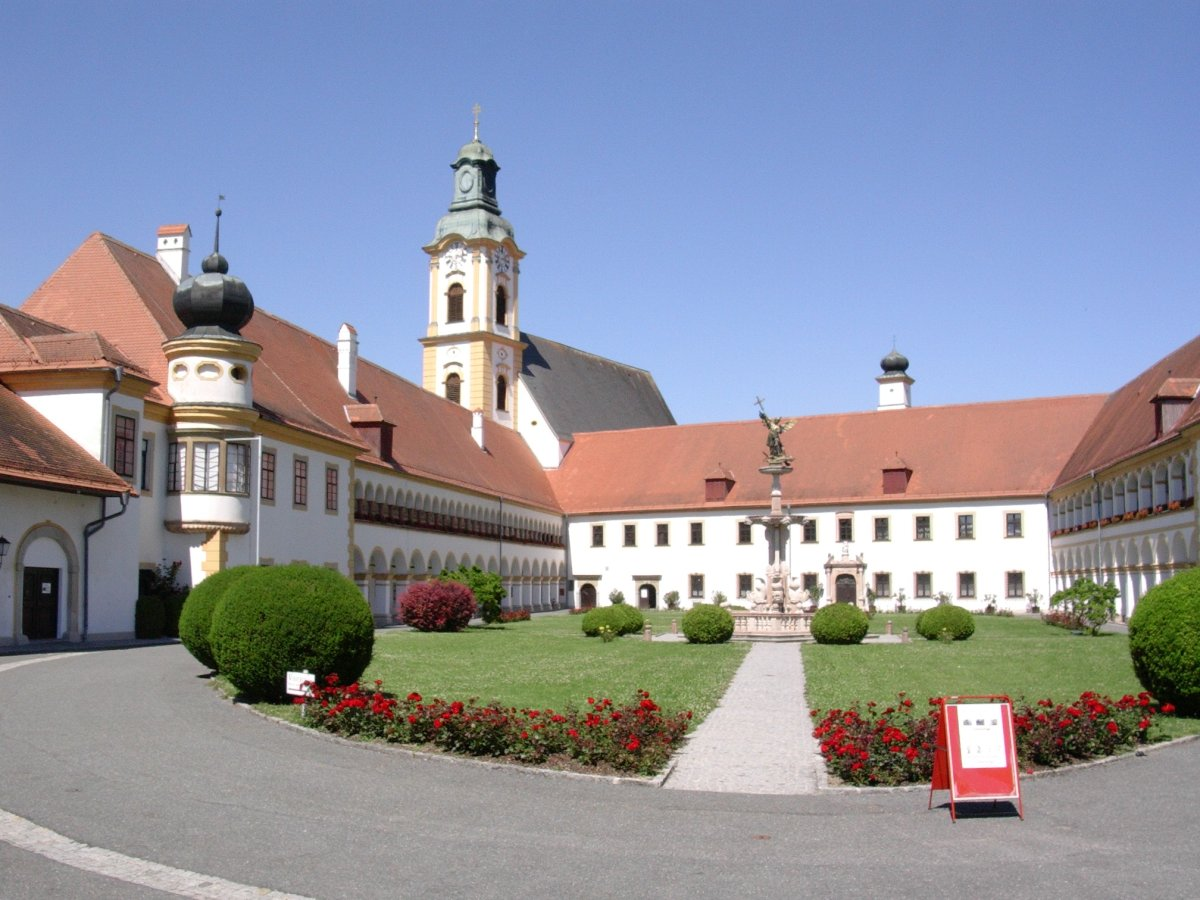

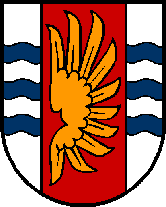
- Coat of arms

- Location within Austria
- Coordinates: 48°20′19″N 13°21′41″E
- Country: Austria
- State: Upper Austria
- District: Ried im Innkreis

Government
  - Mayor: Bernhard Öttl (ÖVP)

Area
  - Total: 21.05 km^{2} (8.13 sq mi)
- Elevation: 347 m (1,138 ft)

Population (2018-01-01)
  - Total: 1,511
  - Density: 71.78/km^{2} (185.9/sq mi)
- Time zone: UTC+1 (CET)
  - Summer (DST): UTC+2 (CEST)
- Postal code: 4981
- Area code: 07758
- Vehicle registration: RI
- Website: www.reichersberg.at

Reichersberg is a municipality in the district of Ried im Innkreis in the Austrian state of Upper Austria.

It is the home of the Reichersberg Abbey.

== Geography ==
Reichersberg lies in the Innviertel. About 11 percent of the municipality is forest, and 72 percent is farmland.
