= Diocese of Eichstätt =

Diocese of the Catholic Church

Diocese of Eichstätt Dioecesis Eystettensis Bistum Eichstätt

Catholic
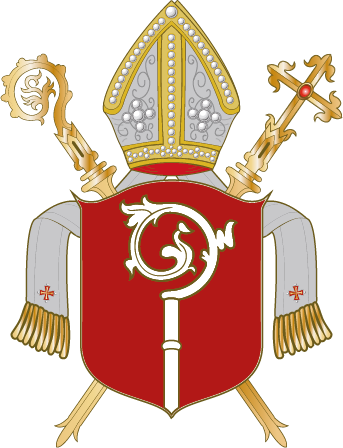
- Coat of arms

Location
- Country: Germany
- Ecclesiastical province: Bamberg

Statistics
- Area: 6,025 km^{2} (2,326 sq mi)
- Population: Total; Catholics: (as of 2006); 890,000; 442,772 (49.7%)

Information
- Denomination: Catholic
- Sui iuris church: Latin Church
- Rite: Roman Rite
- Established: 745
- Cathedral: Eichstätt Cathedral
- Patron saint: St. Walburga; St. Willibald

Current leadership
- Pope: Leo XIV
- Bishop: Christian Würtz
- Metropolitan Archbishop: Herwig Gössl
- Bishops emeritus: Gregor Maria Hanke, OSB

Map
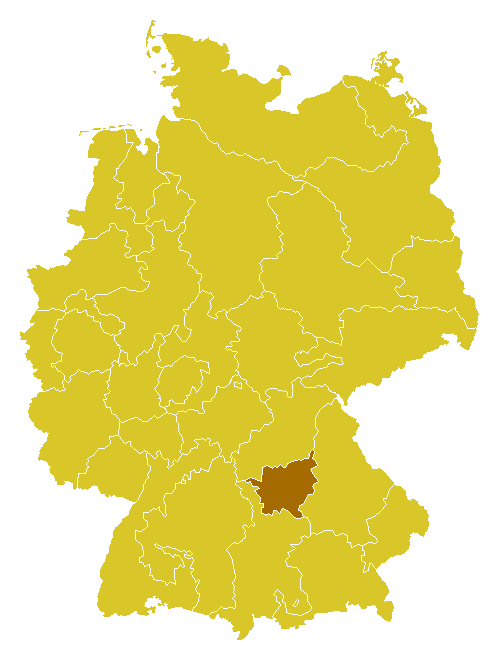

Website
- bistum-eichstaett.de

The Diocese of Eichstätt (Latin: Dioecesis Eystettensis) is a Latin Church diocese of the Catholic Church in Bavaria. Its seat is Eichstätt, and it is subordinate to the archbishop of Bamberg. The diocese was created in 745; it was a state in the Holy Roman Empire (the Prince-Bishopric of Eichstätt) starting in a Middle Ages until 1803. The most recent bishop who led the Diocese of Eichstätt is Dr. Gregor Maria Hanke, OSB; formerly the Abbot of the Benedictine Abbey of Plankstetten, he was named to the See by Pope Benedict XVI on 14 October 2006, and he was consecrated at the Cathedral of Eichstätt on 2 December 2006. The diocese covers an area of 6,025 km^{2}, with 48.9% (as per 31 December 2006) of the population being Roman Catholic.

== List of bishops ==
- List of bishops of Eichstätt

== History ==
The diocese was erected by Saint Boniface in 745; it was subordinate to the archbishop of Mainz. By the Bavarian Concordat of 1817, the diocese was reorganized and made subordinate to the archbishop of Bamberg.

== Ordinaries ==
- Johann von Eych (1 October 1445 Appointed – 1 January 1464 Died)
- Wilhelm von Reichenau (16 January 1464 Appointed – 9 November 1496 Died)
- Gabriel von Eyb (5 December 1496 Appointed – 1 December 1535 Died)
- Christoph Marschalk zu Pappenheim (14 December 1535 Appointed – 13 June 1539 Died)
- Moritz von Hutten (26 June 1539 Appointed – 6 December 1552 Died)
- Eberhard von Hirnheim (22 December 1552 Appointed – 4 July 1560 Died)
- Martin von Schaumberg (14 July 1560 Appointed – 28 June 1590 Died)
- Kaspar von Seckendorff (13 August 1590 Appointed – 2 April 1595 Died)
- Johann Konrad von Gemmingen (2 April 1595 Succeeded – 8 November 1612 Died)
- Johann Christoph von Westerstetten (4 December 1612 Appointed – 28 July 1637 Died)
- Marquard Reichsgraf von Schenk von Castell (28 July 1637 Appointed – 18 January 1685 Died)
- Johann Euchar Reichsgraf von Schenk von Castell (13 March 1685 Appointed – 6 March 1697 Died)
- Johann Martin Reichsritter von Eyb (16 April 1697 Appointed – 6 December 1704 Died)
- Johann Anton Reichsfreiherr von Knebel von Katzenellenbogen (9 February 1705 Appointed – 27 April 1725 Died)
- Franz Ludwig Reichsfreiherr von Schenk von Castell (3 July 1725 Appointed – 19 September 1736 Died)
- Johann Anton Reichsfreiherr von Freyberg-Hopferau (5 December 1736 Appointed – 30 April 1757 Died)
- Raymund Anton Graf von Strasoldo (5 July 1757 Appointed – 13 January 1781 Died)
- Johann Anton Freiherr von Zehmen (27 March 1781 Appointed – 23 June 1790 Died)
- Joseph Graf von Stubenberg (21 September 1790 Appointed – 5 February 1818 Appointed, Archbishop of Bamberg)
- Petrus Pustet (4 Mar 1824 Appointed – 24 Apr 1825 Died)
- Johann Friedrich Oesterreicher (12 May 1825 Appointed – 31 January 1835 Died)
- Johann Martin Manl (25 March 1835 Appointed – 15 October 1835 Died)
- Karl August Graf von Reisach (19 April 1836 Appointed – 12 July 1841 Appointed, Coadjutor Archbishop of Munich and Freising)
- Georg von Oettl (3 October 1846 Appointed – 6 February 1866 Died)
- Franz Leopold Freiherr von Leonrod (13 November 1866 Appointed – 5 September 1905 Died)
- Johannes Leo von Mergel, O.S.B. (5 October 1905 Appointed – 20 June 1932 Died)
- Konrad von Preysing (9 September 1932 Appointed – 5 July 1935 Appointed, Bishop of Berlin)
- Michael Rackl (4 November 1935 Appointed – 5 May 1948 Died)
- Joseph Schröffer (23 July 1948 Appointed – 2 January 1968 Appointed, Titular Archbishop of Volturnum)
- Alois Brems (28 May 1968 Appointed – 1 June 1983 Retired)
- Karl Heinrich Braun (17 April 1984 Appointed – 25 March 1995 Appointed, Archbishop of Bamberg)
- Walter Mixa (24 February 1996 Appointed – 16 July 2005 Appointed, Bishop of Augsburg)
- Gregor Maria Franz Hanke, O.S.B. (14 October 2006 Appointed – 8 June 2025 Resigned)
- Christian Würtz (since 7 July 2026)
