= Rackl =

Rackl is a surname. Notable people with the surname include:

- Markus Rackl (born 1969), German tennis player
- Michael Rackl (1883–1948), German Roman Catholic bishop
