= Menšík =

Menšík (feminine: Menšíková) is a Czech and Slovak surname. It was derived from the comparative degree of the Czech adjective malý (menší = 'smaller') The oldest document of the surname is from 1327. Germanised forms of the surname are Menschick and Menschik.

Notable people with the surname include:

- Eric Mensik (born 1987), American football player
- Jakub Menšík (born 2005), Czech tennis player
- Pavel Menšík (born 1968), Czech rower
- Vladimír Menšík (1929–1988), Czech actor

== See also ==
- Wolfram Menschick (1937–2010), German church musician
