= Branchwork =

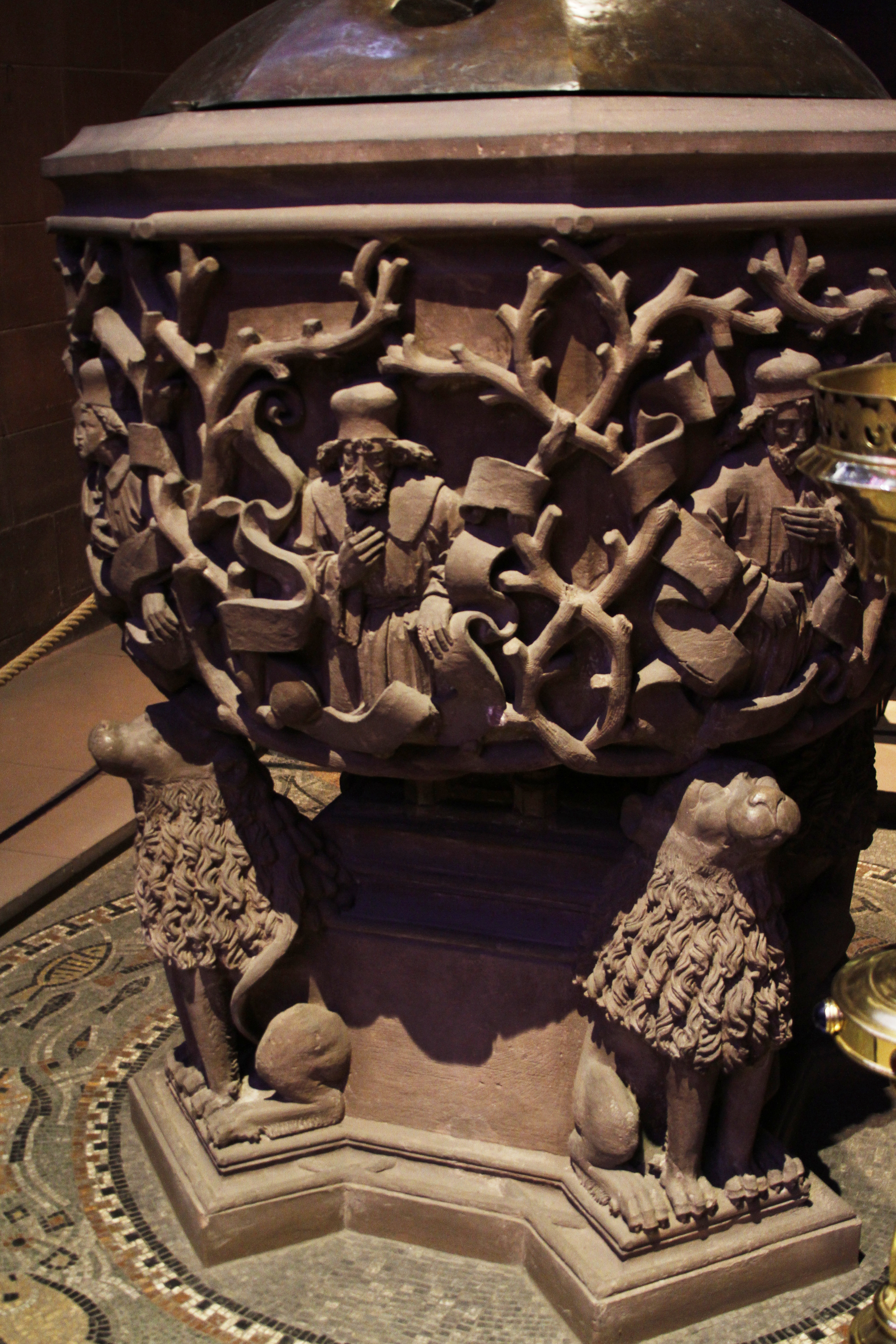
Branchwork on the baptismal font of Worms Cathedral

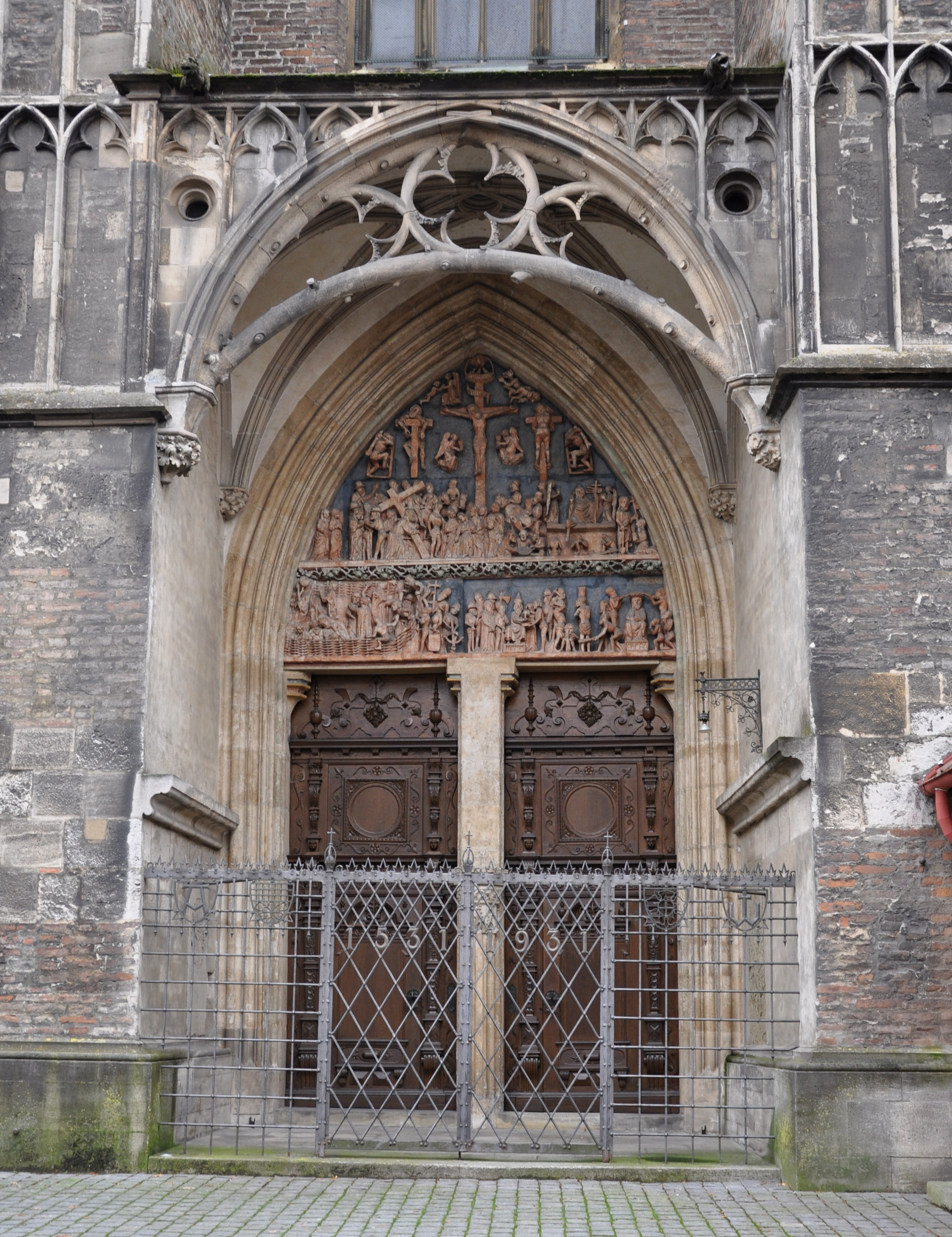
Branchwork tracery at Ulm Minster, c. 1475

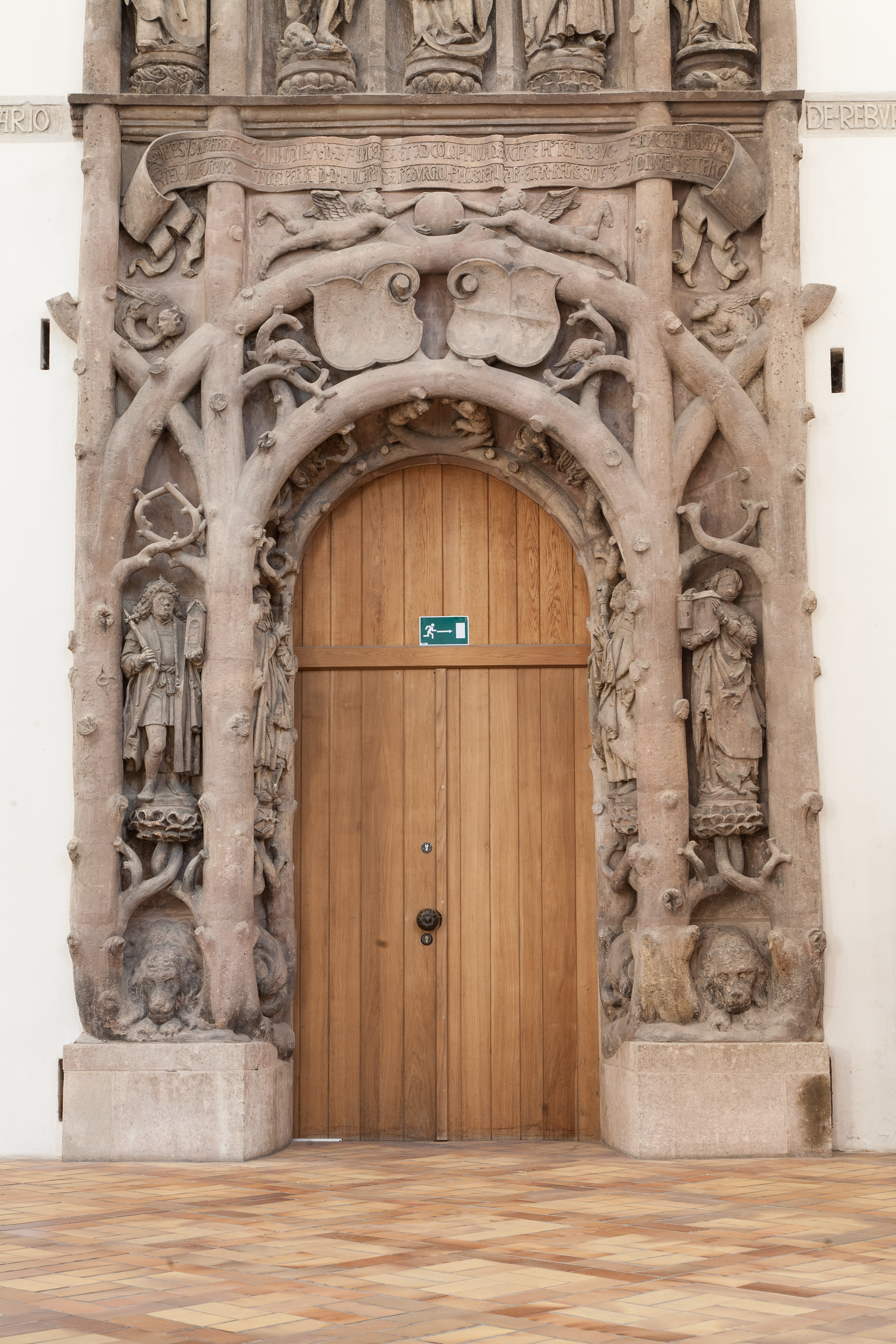
Branchwork portal of the former monastery church of Chemnitz (1525)

Branchwork or branch tracery (German: Astwerk, Dutch: Lofwerk of Loofwerk) is a type of architectural ornament often used in late Gothic architecture and the Northern Renaissance, consisting of knobbly, intertwined and leafless branches. Branchwork was particularly widespread in Central European art between 1480 and 1520 and can be found in all media. The intellectual origin of branchwork lies in theories in Renaissance humanism about the origins of architecture in natural forms and barely-treated natural materials.

In artistic terms it often follows scrolling patterns that had long been used with thinner stem and tendril plant forms. The development of the representation of thicker tree branches had a long history in the crosses in representations of the Crucifixion of Jesus, and the popular subject of the Tree of Jesse.

== Origins and meanings ==
Traditionally branchwork was conceived as a typical ornament of late Gothic art in the lands north of the Alps. Only recently has the connection between the vegetal architectural forms in branchwork and theories of early Renaissance humanism about the origins of architecture been recognized.

Parallel to the increased appearance of branchwork in art from the last third of the 15th century, there is evidence in the treatise literature of an architectural theoretical background to this form of design that recalls Vitruvius's concept of the "Primitive Hut". In his De architectura Vitruvius creates a model for the emergence of architecture from nature, according to which the first people would have built their dwellings from vertical forks of branches with branches laid over them. Filarete also takes up this idea in his book Trattato di architettura, in which he explains the origin of the arch as the first doorway. In the early 16th century similar explanations can be found in the writings of Raphael, among others.

The derivation of the Gothic ogival arch from branches tied together from trees found another historical basis in De Germania by the Roman author Tacitus (c. 98 AD) which was rediscovered in the early 15th century by humanist scholars. Tacitus reports that the Germans worshipped their gods in the forests. The particularities of Gothic architecture north of the Alps – pointed arch vaults in analogy to the canopy of leaves of the Germanic groves – are interpreted by early German humanists as their own national antiquity. Cardinal Francesco Todeschini-Piccolomini (1439–1503), who was in possession of the copy of Germania of his uncle, Pope Pius II, played a decisive role in the reception of Tacitus by German scholars. Several copies of this found their way across the Alps via Regensburg.

== Use ==
In Central European art of the 15th and 16th centuries, architectural elements were often replaced by branches. In stone sculpture, the juxtaposition of architectural and natural elements, such as branches, takes on a further level. First a wooden branch is imitated in stone, which then replaces a component.

A very early example of this new approach to architecture is the vault in the west choir of Eichstätt Cathedral (dated 1471), where the architectural ribs are presented in the shape of a round staff of branches. Here Wilhelm von Reichenau, humanist and bishop of Eichstätt, can be identified as a source of ideas and intellectual background. Wilhelm had studied together with Johannes Pirckheimer, the father of Willibald Pirckheimer, at the University of Padua and represents a typical early representative of early Humanism in Germany with Italian roots. In Johannes Pirckheimer's library there was also a copy of the Germania, which he probably had acquired during his studies in the 1460s.

In Eichstätt, with the so-called "beautiful column" (Schöne Säule) of 1489 in the Mortuarium of the cathedral, there is a further, later example of the use of branchwork. At the same time, this pillar with a twisted shaft is an early example of the revival of Romanesque forms and stylistic features in the 15th century architecture. This style of an Romanesque Renaissance, understood as specifically northern Alpine antiquity, was first used in Early Netherlandish painting for depicting ancient buildings and was also received as an inspiration for new architectural motifs in Germany from around 1460 onwards.

An example of the interlinking of architectural and vegetable form is Tilman Riemenschneider's Heilig-Blut-Altar (St. James's Church, Rothenburg ob der Tauber, 1501/05). Here, the canopies are formed by intertwined branches, which in turn are crowned by an architectural finial. This artistic approach deliberately broke with the expected order and with the comprehensibility of the architectural system.

Similarly, the monumental north portal of the Benedictine monastery church in Chemnitz, which was built in 1525 by the wood carver and stone sculpture Franz Maidburg, combines pre-Gothic (Romanesque) forms like rounded arches with branchwork. Both the style and the figurative program with the founders of the 12th century emperor Lothair II refer here to the distant foundation of the monastery and emphasize the age and venerability of the complex. Also Bramante's tree pillars in the cloister of Sant'Ambrogio in Milan are such an implementation of the architectural theoretical discourse.

== Gallery ==
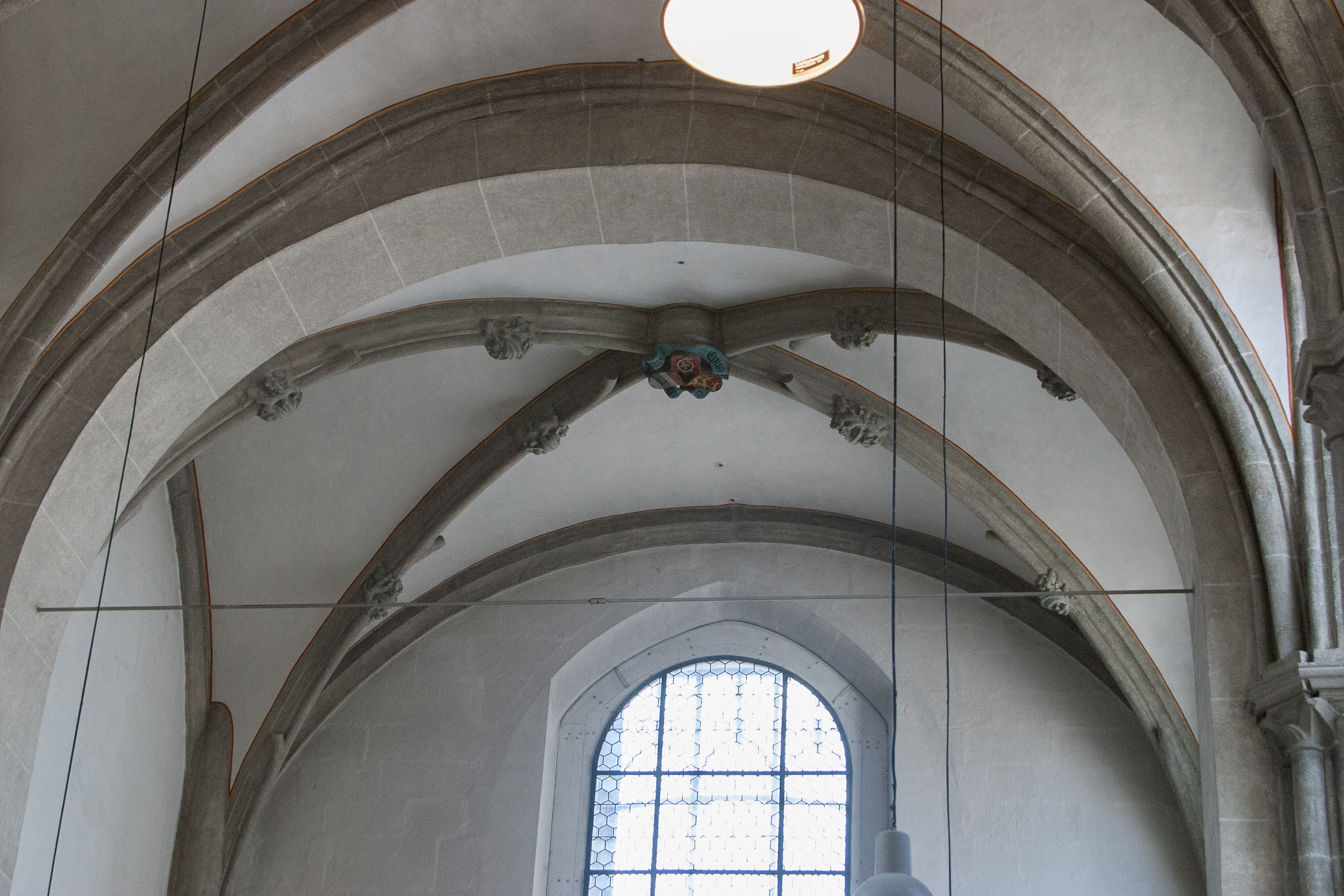
Ribs in Eichstätt Cathedral (1471)

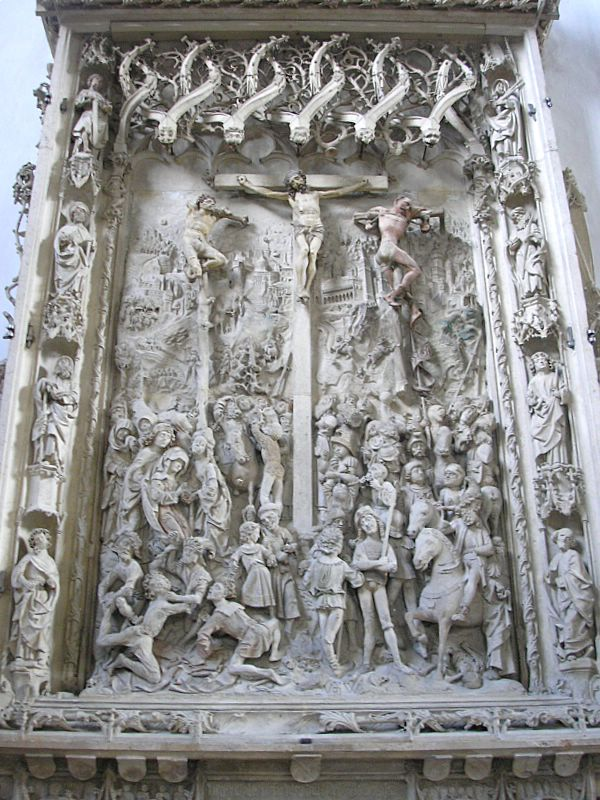
Branchwork in the upper part of the Pappenheim altar in Eichstätt Cathedral

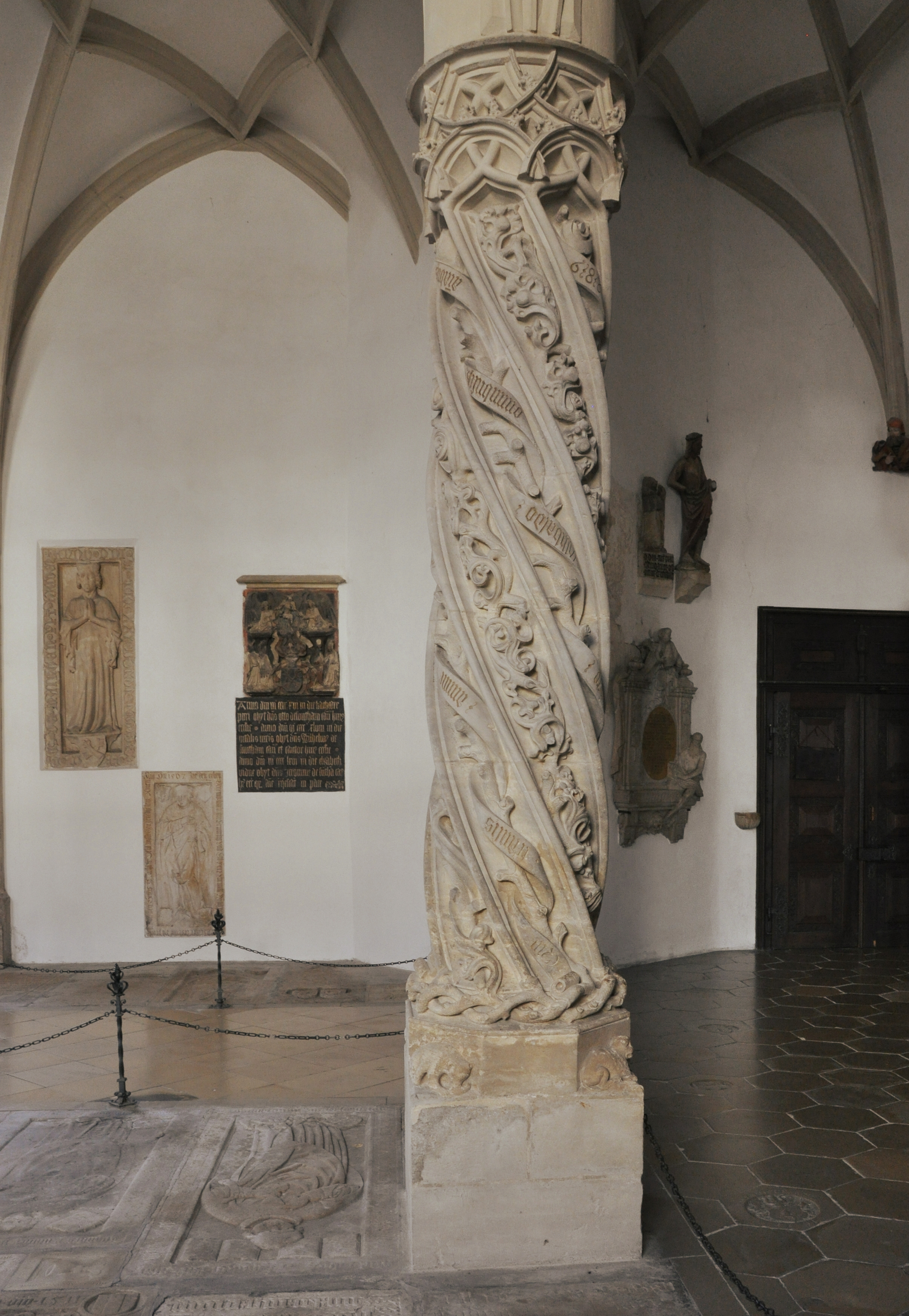
Eichstätt Cathedral, Mortuarium, "Schöne Säule"

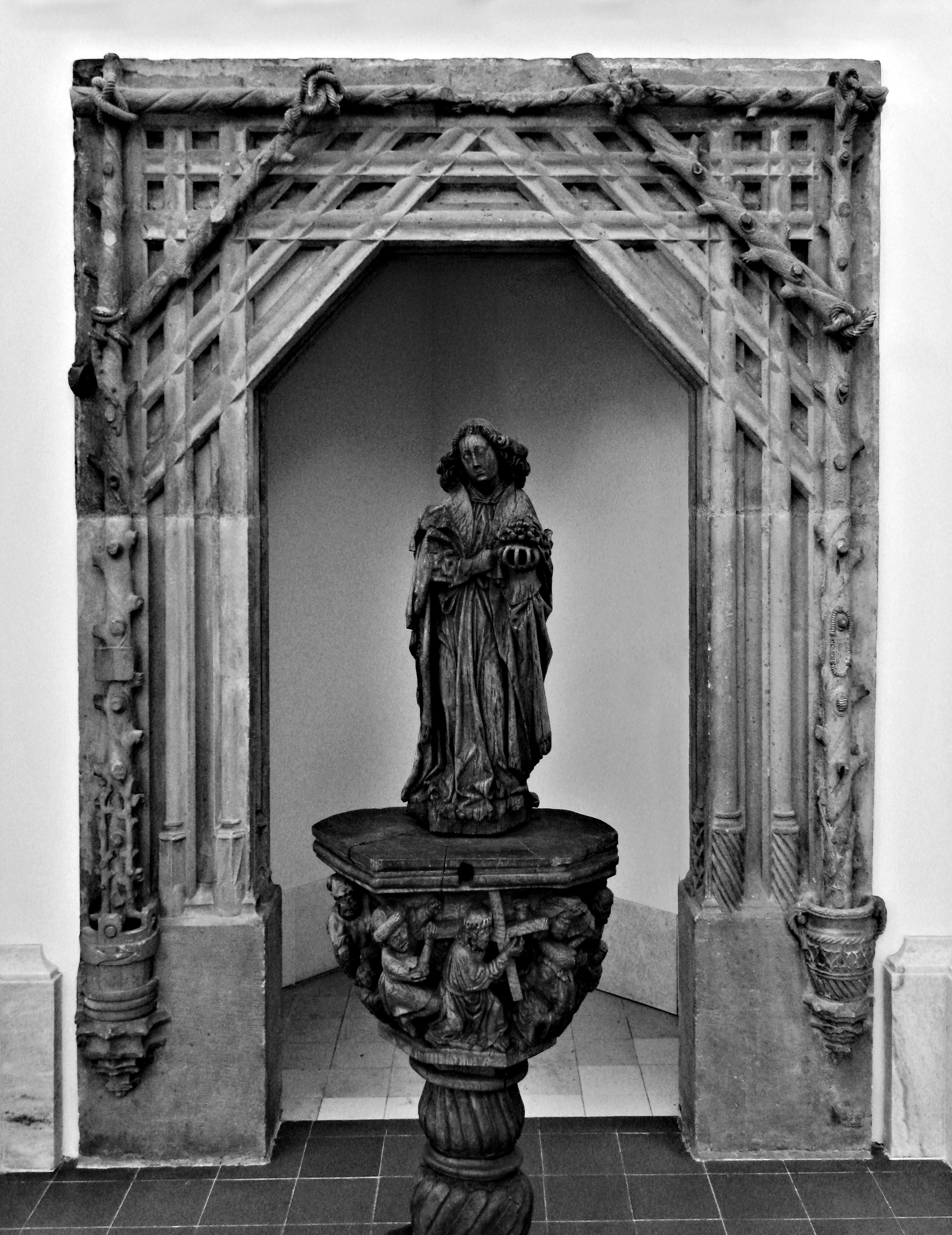
Branchwork portal, 15th century, Berlin, Bode-Museum

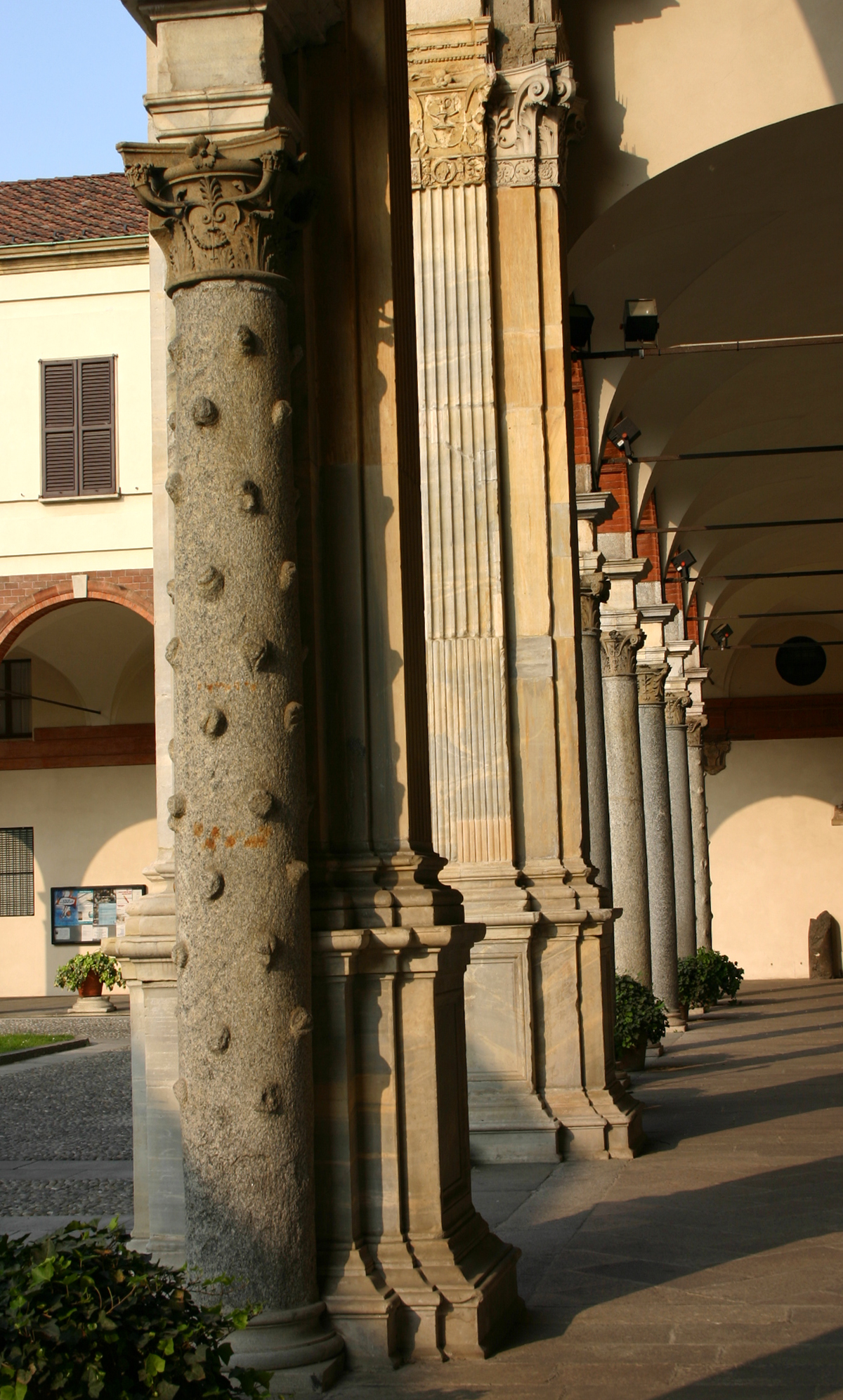
Bramante, tree column in the cloister of Sant' Ambrogio in Milan (1498)

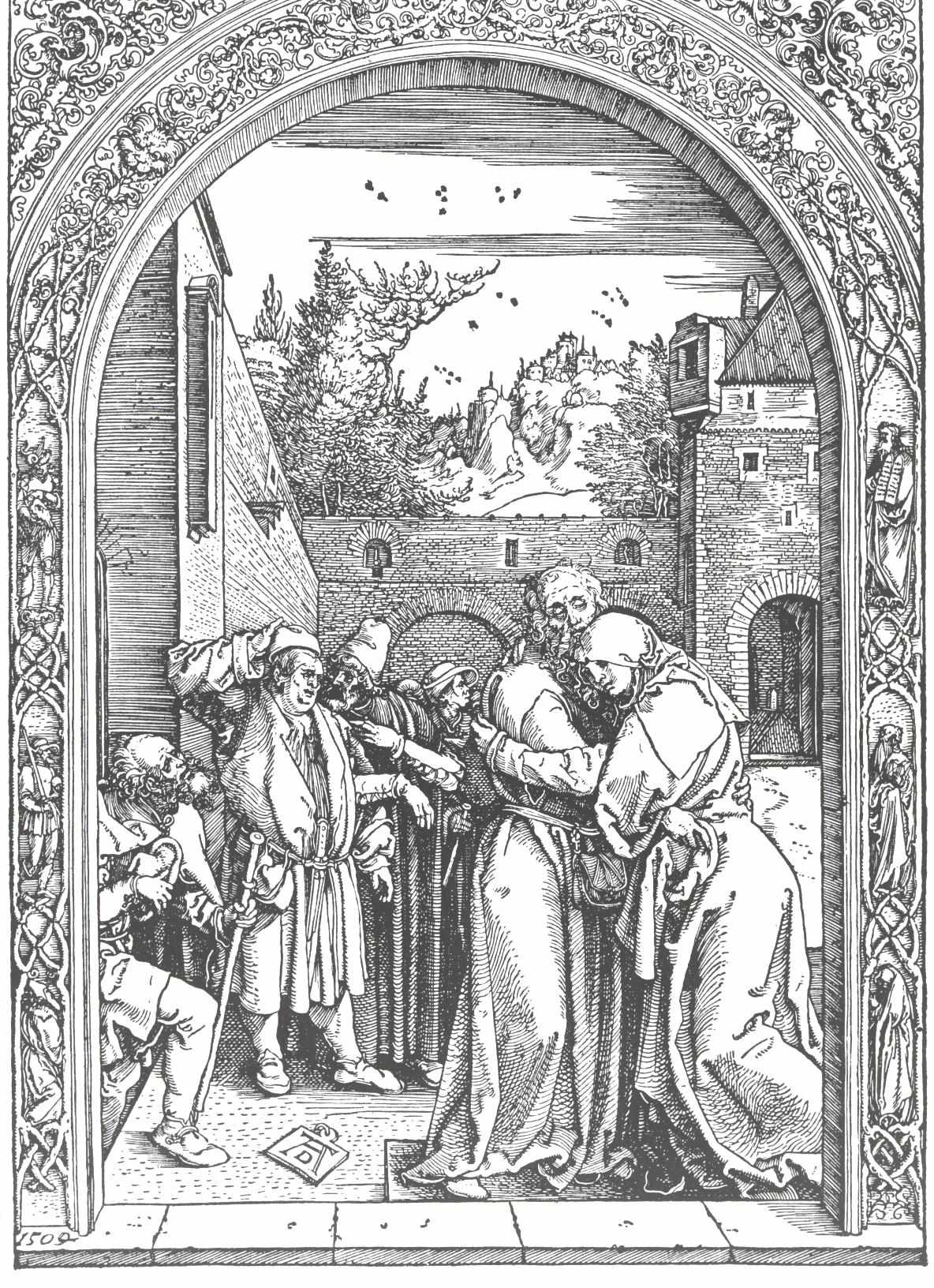
Branchwork as an architectural ornament in Dürer's Life of the Virgin (1504)

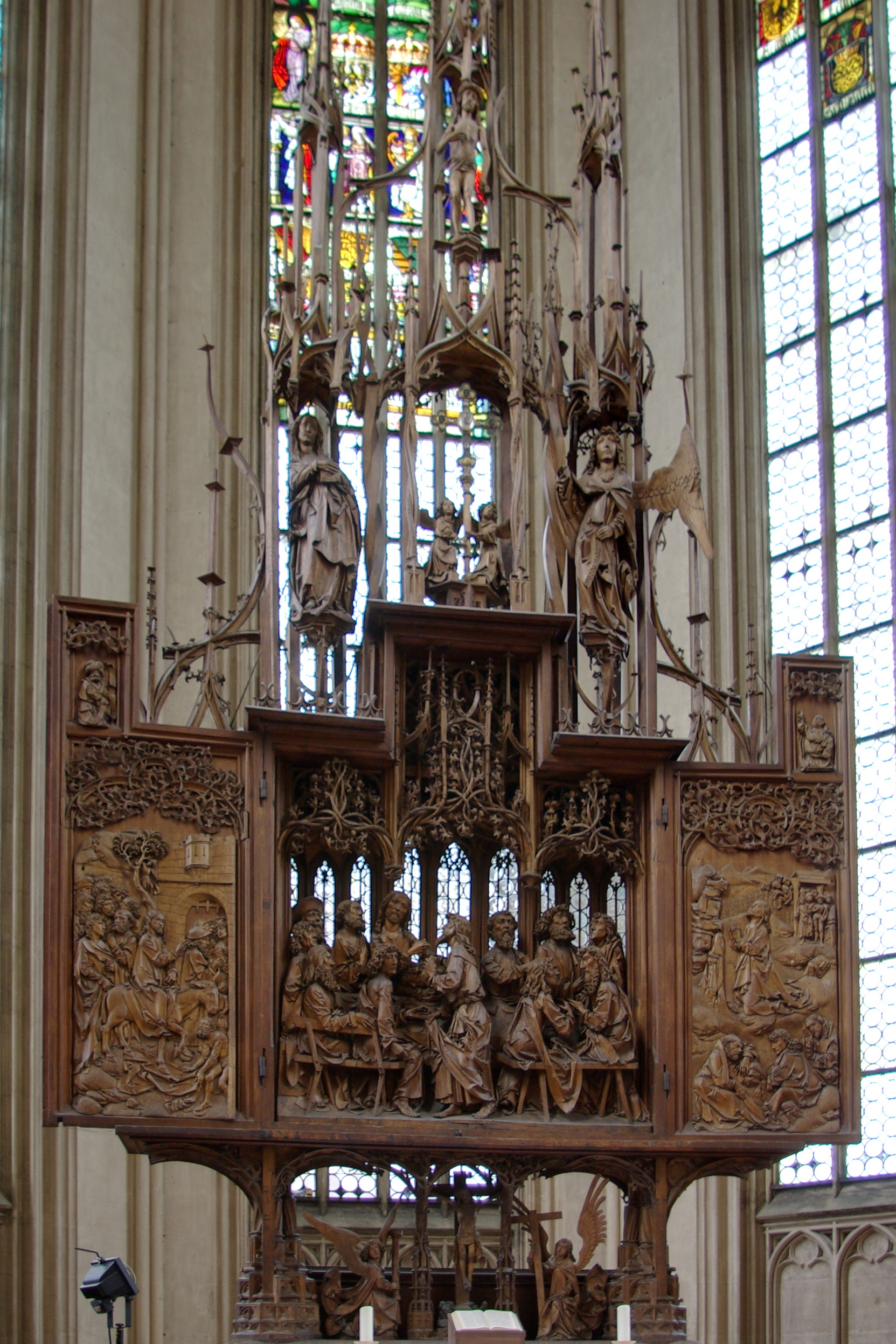
Heilig-Blut-Altar in Rothenburg (1501/05)

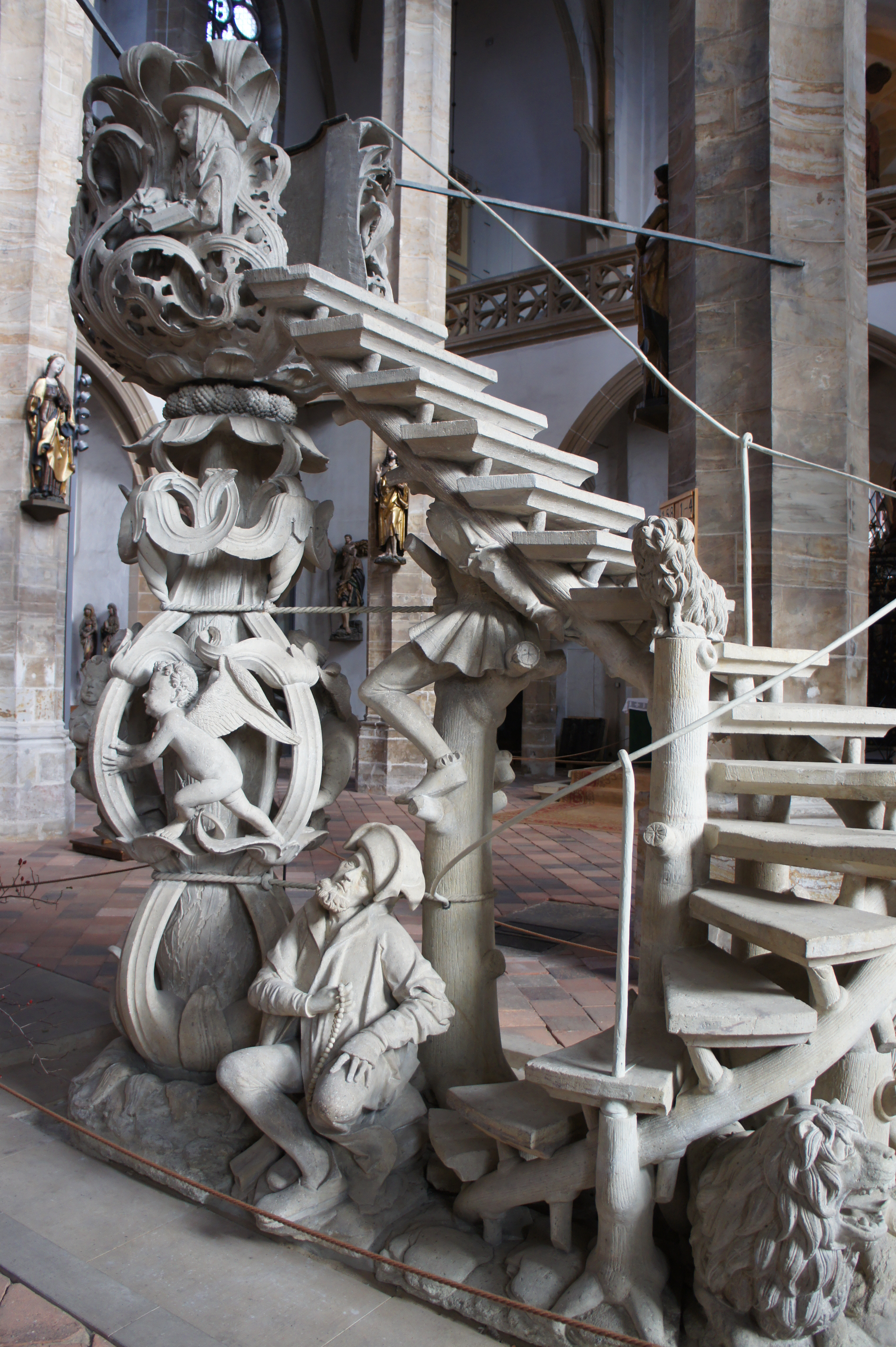
The Tupenkanzel (pulpit in the shape of a tulip) in Freiberg Cathedral (around 1505/10)

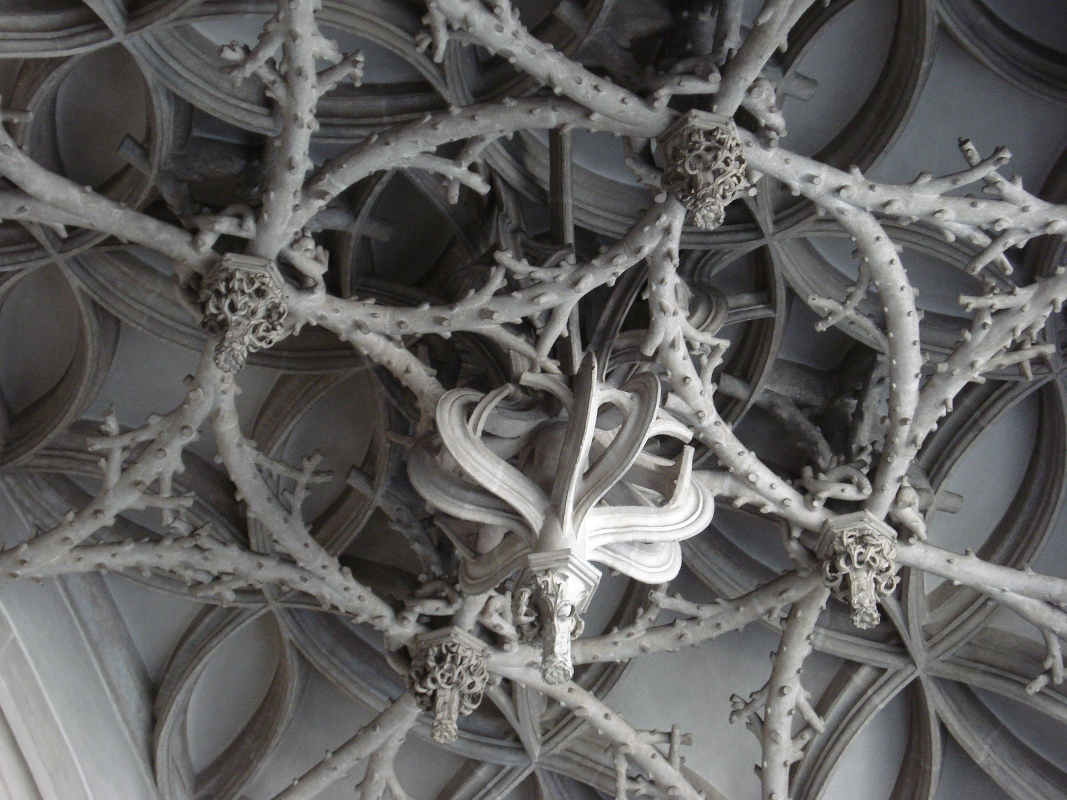
Liebfrauenmünster Ingolstadt, branchwork vault of a side chapel (1515)

== See also ==
- Gothic boxwood miniature
- Tracery

== Literature ==
- Ethan Matt Kavaler: On Vegetal Imagery in Renaissance Gothic. In: Monique Chatenet, Krista De Jonge, Ethan Matt Kavaler, Norbert Nussbaum (Hrsg.): Le Gothique de la Renaissance, actes des quatrième Rencontres d'architecture européenne, Paris, 12–16 juin 2007. (= De Architectura. 13). Paris 2011, pp. 298–312.
- Stephan Hoppe: Northern Gothic, Italian Renaissance and beyond. Toward a 'thick' description of style. In: Monique Chatenet, Krista De Jonge, Ethan Matt Kavaler, Norbert Nussbaum (Hrsg.): Le Gothique de la Renaissance. Actes des quatrième Rencontres d'architecture européenne, Paris, 12 – 16 juin 2007. Paris 2011, pp. 47–64. online version
- Étienne Hamon: Le naturalisme dans l'architecture française autour de 1500. In: Monique Chatenet, Krista De Jonge, Ethan Matt Kavaler, Norbert Nussbaum (Hrsg.): Le Gothique de la Renaissance, actes des quatrième Rencontres d'architecture européenne, Paris, 12–16 juin 2007. (= De Architectura. 13). Paris 2011, pp. 329–343.
- Hubertus Günther: Das Astwerk und die Theorie der Renaissance von der Entstehung der Architektur. In: Michèle-Caroline Heck, Fréderique Lemerle, Yves Pauwels (Hrsg.): Théorie des arts et création artistique dans l’Europe du Nord du XVIe au début du XVIII siècle, Villeneuve d’Ascq (Lille). 2002, pp. 13–32. online version
- Hanns Hubach: Johann von Dalberg und das naturalistische Astwerk in der zeitgenössischen Skulptur in Worms, Heidelberg und Ladenburg. In: Gerold Bönnen, Burkard Keilmann (Hrsg.): Der Wormser Bischof Johann von Dalberg (1482–1503) und seine Zeit. (= Quellen und Abhandlungen zur mittelrheinischen Kirchengeschichte. Band 117). Mainz 2005, pp. 207–232. Online-Version auf ART-dok
- Hartmut Krohm: Der „Modellcharakter“ der Kupferstiche mit dem Bischofsstab und Weihrauchfaß. In: Albert Châtelet (Hg.): Le beau Martin. Etudes et mises au point. Colmar 1994, pp. 185–207.
- Paul Crossley: The Return to the Forest: Natural Architecture and the German Past in the Age of Dürer. In: Thomas W. Gaehtgens (Hrsg.): Künstlerischer Austausch, Akten des 28. Internationalen Kongresses für Kunstgeschichte. Band 2, Berlin 1993, pp. 71–80.
- Walter Paatz: Das Aufkommen des Astwerkbaldachins in der deutschen spätgotischen Skulptur und Erhard Reuwichs Titelholzschnitt in Breidenbachs „Peregrinationes in terram sanctam“. In: Siegfried Joost (Hrsg.): Bibliotheca docet. Festgabe für Carl Wehmer. Amsterdam 1963, pp. 355–368.
