= Joseph Schröffer =

Catholic cardinal

His Eminence Joseph Schröffer
- Cardinal-Deacon of San Saba
- Church: Roman Catholic Church
- Appointed: 24 May 1976
- Term ended: 7 September 1983
- Predecessor: Jean-Guenolé-Marie Daniélou
- Successor: Jean Jérôme Hamer
- Previous posts: Bishop of Eichstätt (1948-68); Secretary of the Congregation for Catholic Education (1967-76); Titular Archbishop of Volturno (1968-76)

Orders
- Ordination: 28 October 1928
- Consecration: 21 September 1948 by Joseph Otto Kolb
- Created cardinal: 5 March 1973 by Pope Paul VI
- Rank: Cardinal-Priest

Personal details
- Born: Joseph Martin Schröffer; 20 February 1903 Ingolstadt, Germany
- Died: 7 September 1983 (aged 80) Nürenberg, Germany
- Buried: Eichstätt Cathedral
- Education: Pontifical Gregorian University
- Motto: Redeamus ad cor et inveniamus eum
- Coat of arms

Styles of Joseph Schröffer
- Reference style: His Eminence
- Spoken style: Your Eminence
- Informal style: Cardinal
- See: none

Joseph Schröffer (February 20, 1903 – September 7, 1983) was a German Cardinal of the Roman Catholic Church. He served as Secretary of the Sacred Congregation of Seminaries and Universities from 1967 to 1976, and was elevated to the cardinalate in 1976.

== Biography ==
Born in Ingolstadt, Joseph Schröffer studied at the seminary in Eichstätt and the Pontifical Gregorian University in Rome before being ordained to the priesthood on October 28, 1928. He then furthered his studies in Rome until 1931, when he undertook his pastoral ministry among German exiles until 1933. Before serving as vicar general of Eichstätt from 1941 to 1948, he taught at the Superior School of Philosophy and Theology there.

Coat of arms as bishop of Eichstätt

On July 23, 1948, Schröffer was appointed Bishop of Eichstätt by Pope Pius XII. He received his episcopal consecration on the following September 21 from Archbishop Joseph Otto Kolb, with Bishops Joseph Wendel and Arthur Landgraf serving as co-consecrators. Schröffer attended the Second Vatican Council from 1962 to 1965, and entered the Roman Curia upon being named Secretary of the Sacred Congregation of Seminaries and Universities on May 17, 1967. As Secretary, he was the second-highest official of that dicastery, successively under Cardinals Giuseppe Pizzardo and Gabriel-Marie Garrone. Schröffer was later advanced to Titular Archbishop of Volturnum on January 2, 1968. In 1973, following the release of the Congregation for the Doctrine of the Faith's document Mysterium Ecclesia, the Archbishop attacked the liberal theologian Hans Küng for his opposition to papal infallibility.

Pope Paul VI created him Cardinal Deacon of S. Saba in the consistory of May 24, 1976. On that same date, Schröffer resigned as Secretary of Seminaries and Universities, after nine years of service. He was one of the cardinal electors who participated in the conclaves of August and October 1978, which selected Popes John Paul I and John Paul II respectively. The Cardinal served as a special papal representative to the jubilee celebration of the Cologne Cathedral on August 15, 1980.

Schröffer died in Nuremberg at age 80, and is buried in Eichstätt Cathedral.

Catholic Church titles
| Preceded by Michael Rackl | Bishop of Eichstätt; 1948–1967 | Succeeded by Alois Brems |
| Preceded by Dino Staffa | Secretary of the Sacred Congregation of Seminaries and Universities; 1967–1976 | Succeeded by Antonio María Javierre Ortas, SDB |
