= Tracery =

Type of window design

Plate tracery and bar tracery

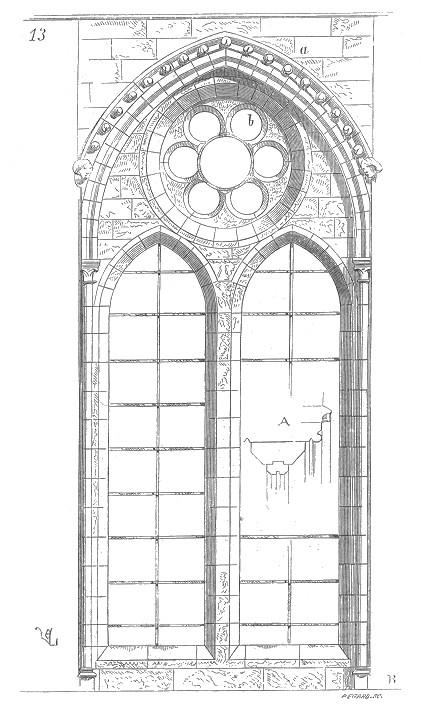
Plate tracery in the nave aisle windows of Soissons Cathedral (c. 1200)

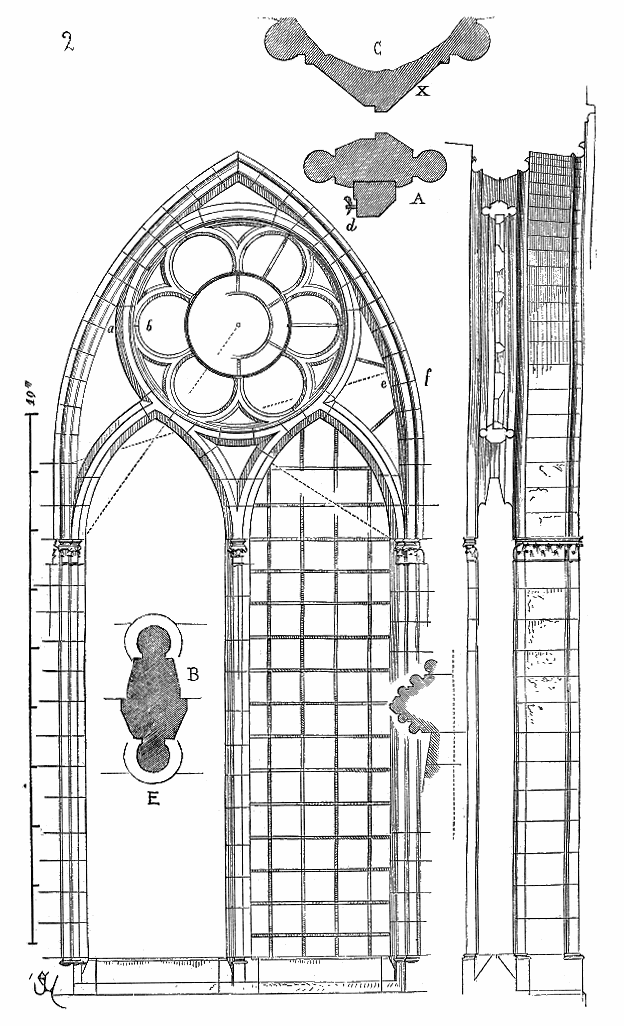
Bar tracery in the clerestory windows at Reims Cathedral (1230s). A cross section through a mullion is shown within the left lancet.

Tracery is an architectural device by which windows (or screens, panels, and vaults) are divided into sections of various proportions by stone bars or ribs of moulding. Most commonly, it refers to the stonework elements that support the glass in a window. The purpose of the device is practical as well as decorative, because the increasingly large windows of Gothic buildings needed maximum support against the wind. The term probably derives from the tracing floors on which the complex patterns of windows were laid out in late Gothic architecture. Tracery can be found on the exterior of buildings as well as the interior.

There are two main types: plate tracery and the later bar tracery. The evolving style from Romanesque to Gothic architecture and changing features, such as the thinning of lateral walls and enlarging of windows, led to the innovation of tracery. The earliest form of tracery, called plate tracery, began as openings that were pierced from a stone slab. Bar tracery was then implemented, having derived from the plate tracery. However, instead of a slab, the windows were defined by moulded stone mullions, which were lighter and allowed for more openings and intricate designs.

Pointed arch windows of Gothic buildings were initially (late 12th–late 13th centuries) lancet windows, a solution typical of the Early Gothic and of the Early English Gothic. Plate tracery was the first type of tracery to be developed, emerging in the style called High Gothic. High Gothic is distinguished by the appearance of bar tracery, allowing the construction of much larger window openings, and the development of curvilinear tracery, ultimately contributing to the Flamboyant style. Late Gothic in most of Europe saw tracery patterns resembling lace develop, while in England Perpendicular Gothic preferred plainer vertical mullions and transoms.

== Plate tracery ==
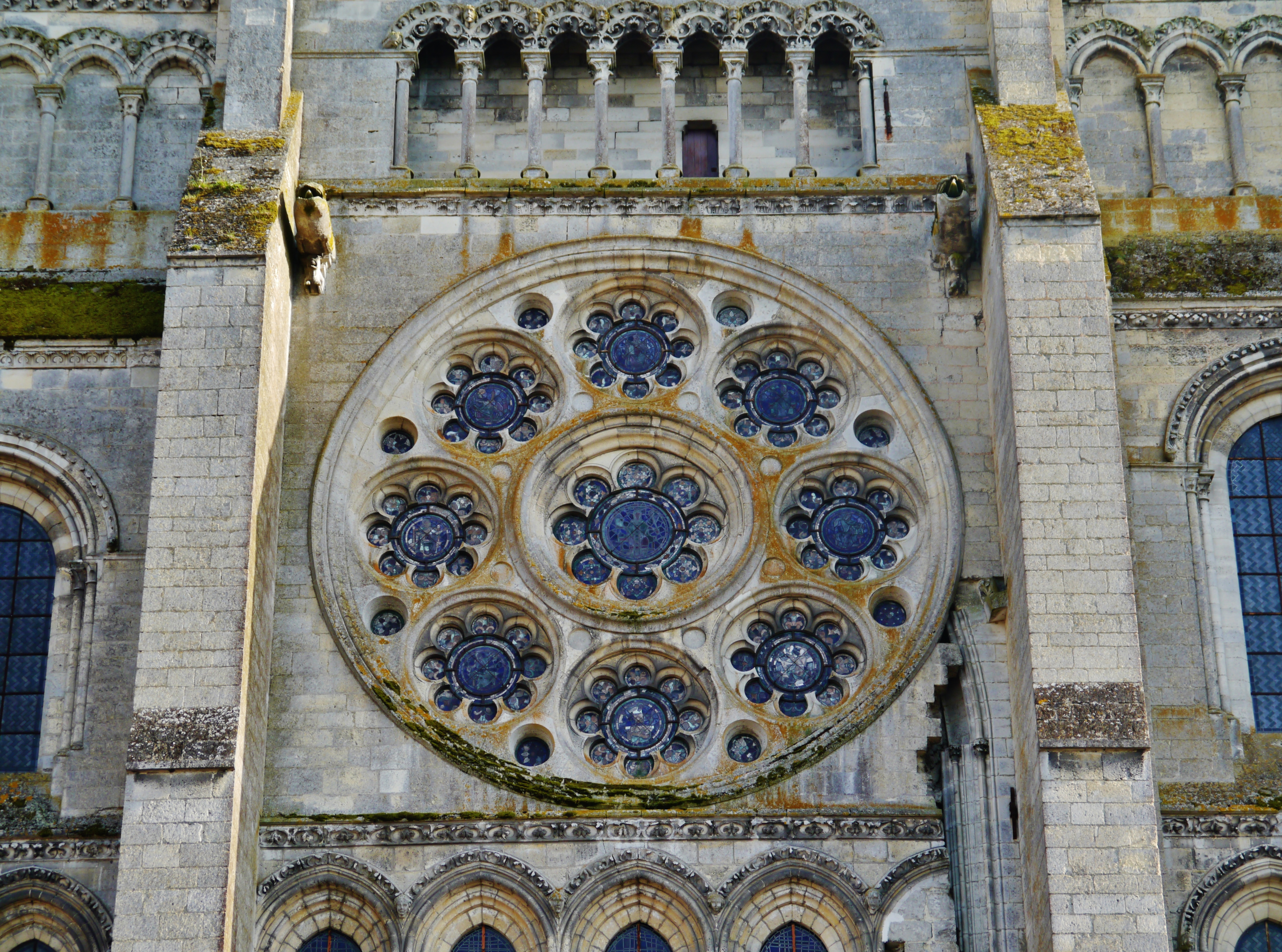
Plate tracery, Laon Cathedral, north rose window

Plate tracery, in which lights were pierced in a thin wall of ashlar, allowed a window arch to have more than one light – typically two side by side and separated by flat stone spandrels. The spandrels were then sculpted into figures like a roundel or a quatrefoil. Plate tracery reached the height of its sophistication with the 12th-century windows of Chartres Cathedral and in the "Dean's Eye" rose window at Lincoln Cathedral.

The earliest form of window tracery, typical of Gothic architecture before the early 13th century, is known as plate tracery because the individual lights (the glazed openings in the window) have the appearance of being cut out of a flat plate of masonry. Romanesque church windows were normally quite small, somewhat taller than wide and with a simple round-headed ('segmental') arch at the top. From around the 1140s, the pointed arch Gothic window (employed by Abbot Suger for the redesign of the choir at St Denis) started to take over.

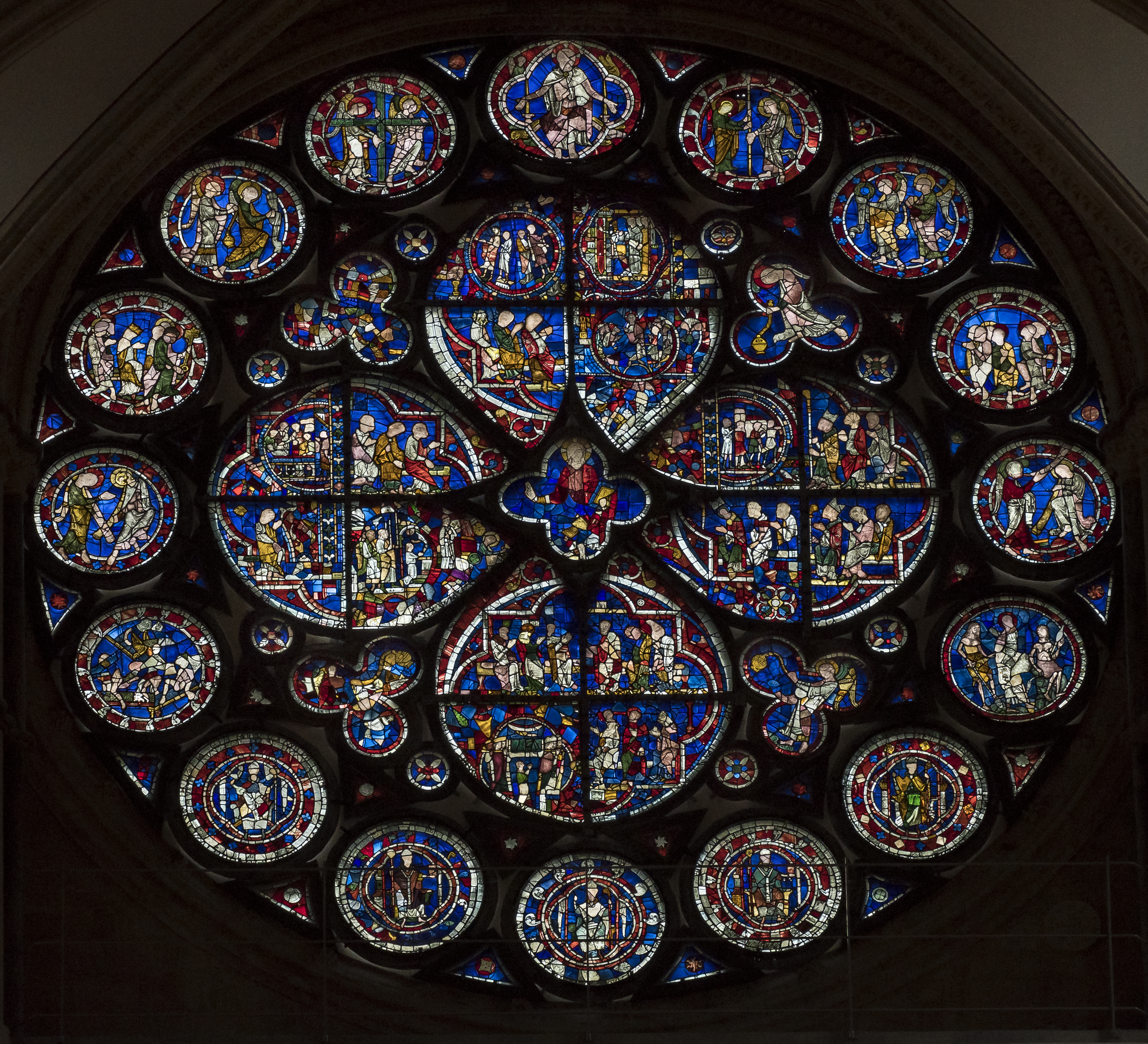
Plate tracery, Lincoln Cathedral "Dean's Eye" rose window (c. 1225)

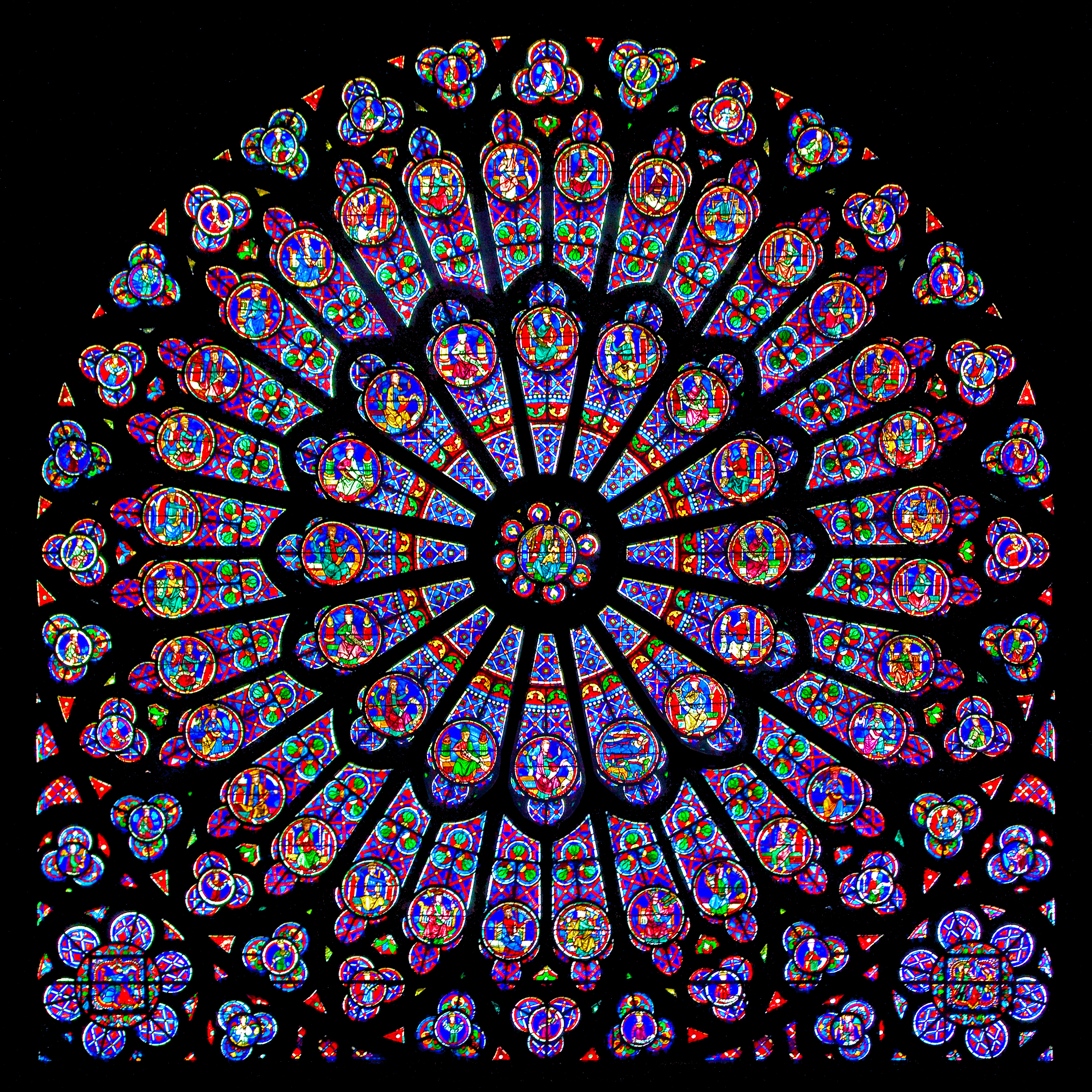
Rayonnant bar tracery, Notre-Dame de Paris, north rose window

As the buttressing systems of early Gothic architecture reduced the structural need for broad expanses of thick walls, window openings grew progressively larger and instead of having just one very large window per bay division (which would create problems with supporting the glass), the typical early-Gothic 'twin lancet plus oculus' form of plate tracery developed. This consists of two (sometimes three) tall thin lights topped with pointed arches, with a round or trefoil opening placed above them, often contained within a blind arch which gives the whole assemblage a pointed lancet shape (see the example from Soissons Cathedral). With this type of design, the spandrels (i.e. the spaces between the tops of the lancet windows and the oculus) are just blank wall. The practicalities of building window tracery in this way severely limited the complexity of designs that could be produced and although plate tracery designs evolved over the course of the 12th and early 13th centuries, in practice, the only real variation was in the number and size of lancets and in the trefoils, quatrefoils and oculi used to fill the spaces above them.

The rose windows of early- and high-Gothic cathedrals, such as the example in the north transept of Laon Cathedral (1170s) or the west facade at Chartres (c. 1210), also employed plate tracery. This greatly limited the overall amount of light admitted to the interior by these windows, as well as restricting the complexity of patterns that could be created.

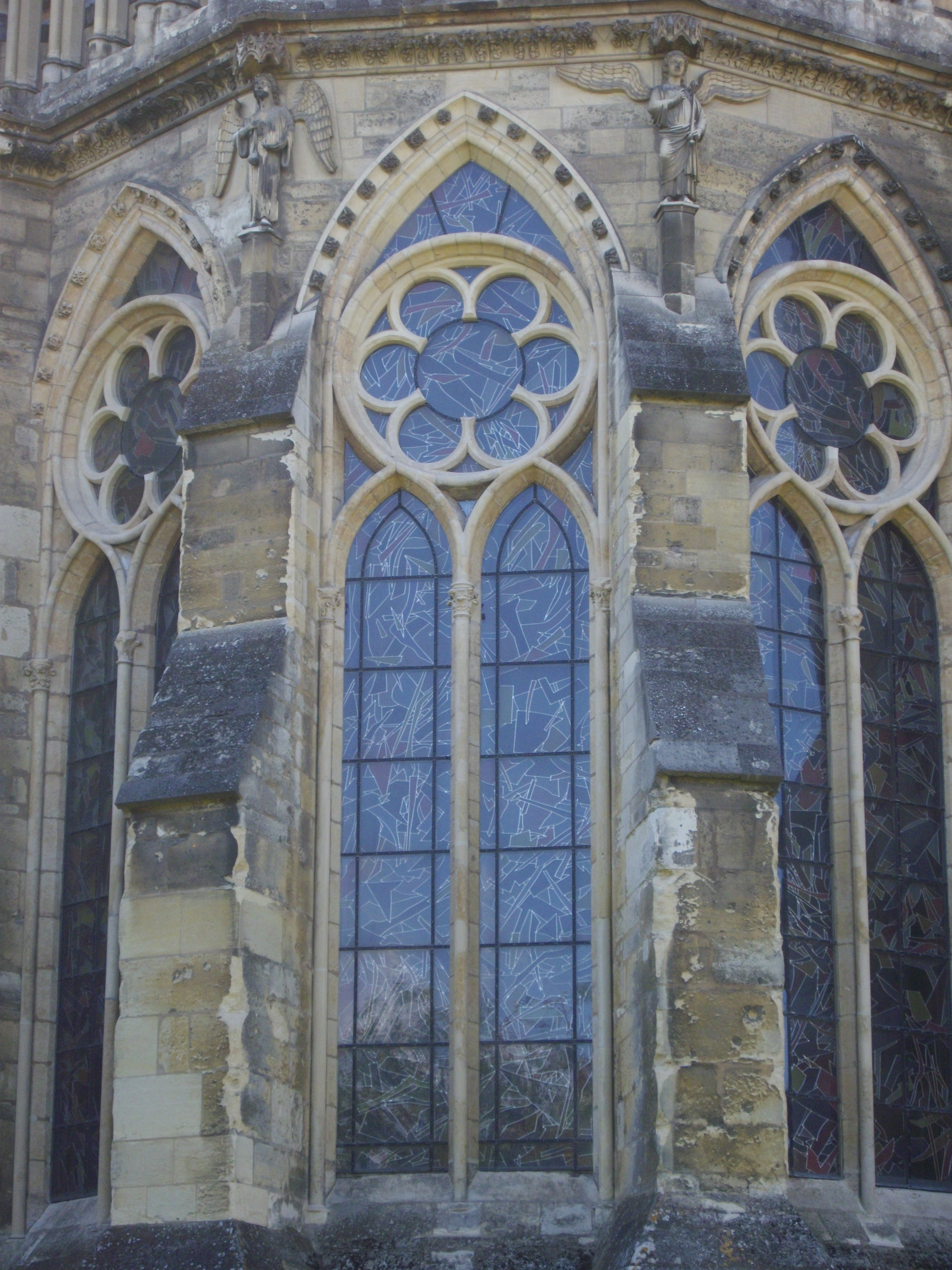
Bar tracery with cusped circles, Reims Cathedral, apse chapel

== Bar tracery ==
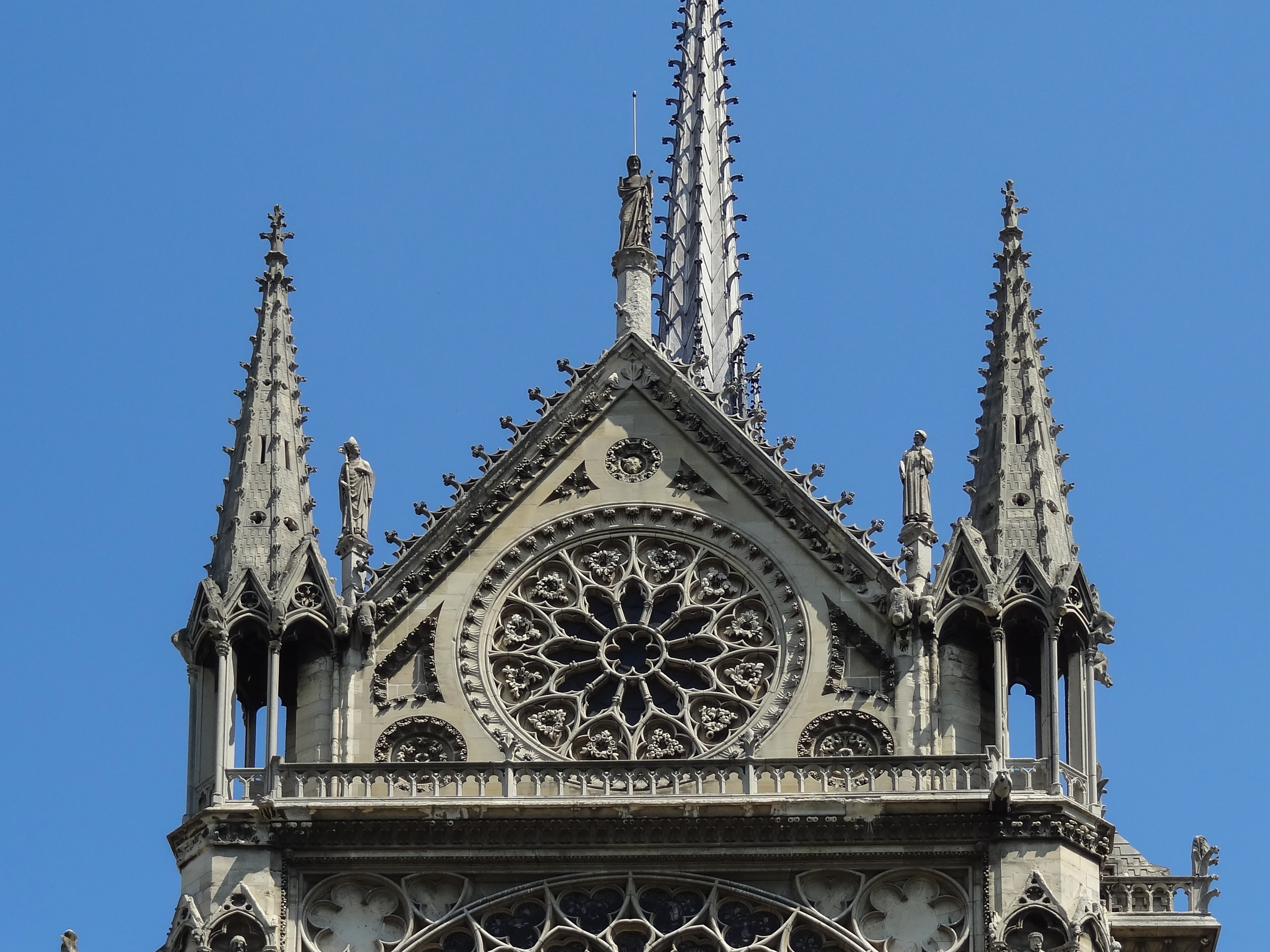
Rayonnant bar tracery, Notre-Dame de Paris, south rose window

At the beginning of the 13th century, plate tracery was superseded by bar tracery. Bar tracery divides the large lights from one another with moulded mullions. Bar tracery, an important decorative element of Gothic styles, appeared first at Reims and was employed in England around 1240. After 1220, master builders in England had begun to treat the window openings as a series of openings divided by thin stone bars, while before 1230 the apse chapels of Reims Cathedral were decorated with bar tracery with cusped circles (with bars radiating from the centre). Bar tracery became common after c. 1240, with increasing complexity and decreasing weight. The lines of the mullions continued beyond the tops of the window lights and subdivided the open spandrels above the lights into a variety of decorative shapes. Rayonnant style (c. 1230–c. 1350) was enabled by the development of bar tracery in Continental Europe and is named for the radiation of lights around a central point in circular rose windows. Rayonnant also deployed mouldings of two different types in tracery, where earlier styles had used moulding of a single size, with different sizes of mullions. The rose windows of Notre-Dame de Paris (c. 1270) are typical.

The earliest bar tracery designs were made for the aisle windows at Reims Cathedral around 1215. The Reims windows still used the same 'two lancets plus oculus' pattern (as in the Soissons example above), but now the glass panels were held between narrow stone mullions made up of carefully shaped lengths of masonry (fitted together with mortar and metal pins) quite distinct from the wall surrounding them. These mullions were much more slender than the corresponding elements in plate-tracery windows and crucially, the previously solid wall areas such as the spandrels could also now be glazed, greatly increasing the amount of light admitted.

The cross-section of each mullion or tracery bar was important both for the structural integrity of the window and for the visual effect. As can be seen in Viollet-le-Duc's diagram (right) there was normally a roll-moulding on both the inside and outside of the windows, which made the mullions appear even more slender than they actually were. The shoulder marked 'B' on the diagram is the glazing slot, into which the metal frame (armature) of the window glass is mounted. Unlike with plate tracery, where each stone had to be individually shaped, the elements of bar tracery could be mass-produced to standard templates in the mason's yard – work that could continue even when it was too cold for lime mortar to set. The technical aspects of the windows at Reims clearly fascinated Villard de Honnecourt, who visited the construction site, probably in the 1220s, and made a detailed sketch of the various templates, using a key to show how they fitted into the different parts of the window (the templates are in the lower half of folio 32 recto; the symbols besides the templates match similar ones on the detailed drawing of the Reims elevations on the facing page, folio 31 verso).

== French Gothic ==
=== Rayonnant Gothic ===
Rayonnant is the term used particularly to describe the style that produced the great rose windows of France. These windows deck not only the west fronts of churches, but often, as at Notre-Dame de Paris, the transept gables as well. It is common that although the transepts of French churches do not project strongly, they are given visual importance almost equal to the west front, including large decorated portals and a rose window. Particularly fine examples are at Notre-Dame and Chartres Cathedral.

=== Flamboyant Gothic ===
The ogee arch is drafted from four points, creating a flame-like S-shaped curve. These arches create a rich and lively effect when used for window tracery and surface decoration. The form is structurally weak and has very rarely been used for large openings except when contained within a larger and more stable arch.

Some of the most beautiful and famous traceried windows of Europe employ this type of tracery. It can be seen at St Stephen's Vienna, Sainte-Chapelle in Paris, at the Cathedrals of Limoges and Rouen in France. In German and Spanish Gothic architecture, it often appears as openwork screens on the exterior of buildings. The style was used to rich and sometimes extraordinary effect in both these countries, notably on the famous pulpit in Vienna Cathedral.

== English Gothic ==
=== Geometrical tracery ===
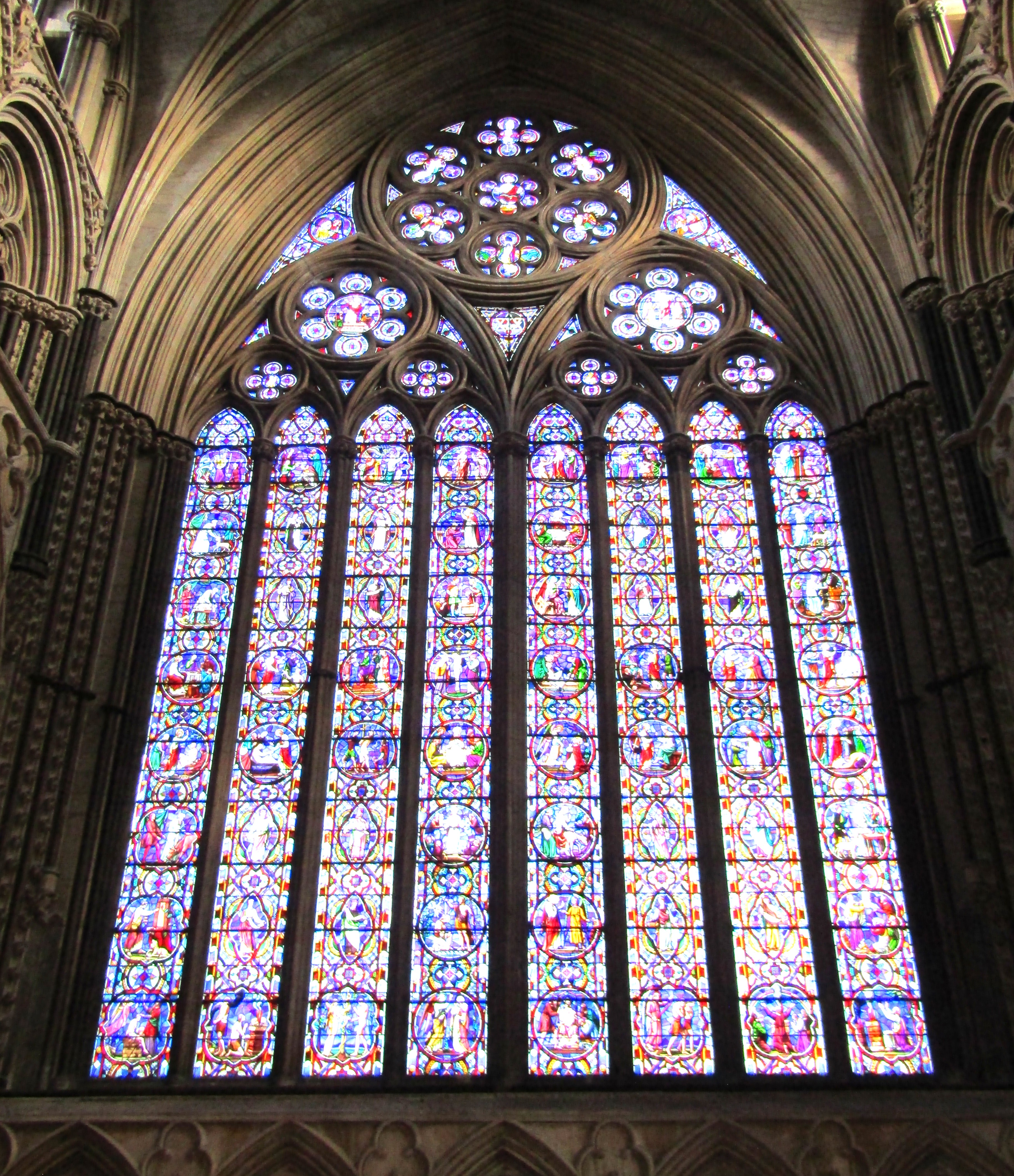
Geometrical tracery in the east window of Lincoln Cathedral

The early phase of the Decorated style (late 13th century) is characterized by Geometrical tracery – simple bar tracery forming patterns of foiled arches and circles interspersed with triangular lights. The mullions of Geometrical style typically had capitals with curved bars emerging from them. Intersecting bar tracery (c. 1300) deployed mullions without capitals which branched off equidistant to the window-head. The window-heads themselves were formed of equal curves forming a pointed arch and the tracery bars were curved by drawing curves with differing radii from the same centres as the window-heads. The mullions were in consequence branched into Y-shaped designs further ornamented with cusps. The intersecting branches produced an array of lozenge-shaped lights in between numerous lancet arched lights. Y-tracery was often employed in two-light windows c. 1300.

Geometrical tracery is identified by the circular openings at the head of the arch of the window. A common composition is three lights beneath two circles and a third at the point of the arch; such an example can be seen along the aisle at Lincoln Cathedral Also at Lincoln Cathedral, the east window is an expanded version of this idea with two interior arches, a total of eight lower lights, four small circular lights topped with two larger circles to fill out the interior arches, and finally above all one large circular shape filled with seven smaller circular lights. Geometrical tracery, in its early stages, had a rule of equilateral law, where the tracery design follows the shape of the arch in an equilateral manner. Additional decorative elements can be implemented, such as foliation or the "spherical triangle". The use of spherical triangles is a later adaption, derived from Westminster Abbey, and likely reflects religious significance.

The equilateral arch lends itself to filling with tracery of simple equilateral, circular and semi-circular forms. In France, windows of clerestories and other larger windows were commonly divided into two lights, with some simple Geometric tracery above, a circle or a cinquefoil or sexfoil. This style of window remained popular without great change until after 1300.

In England there was a much greater variation in the design of tracery that evolved to fill these spaces. The style is known as Geometric Decorated Gothic and can be seen to splendid effect at many English cathedrals and major churches, where both the eastern and the western terminations of the building may be occupied by a single large window such as the east window at Lincoln. Windows of complex design and of three or more lights or vertical sections are often designed by overlapping two or more equilateral arches springing from the vertical mullions.

=== Curvilinear (flowing) tracery ===
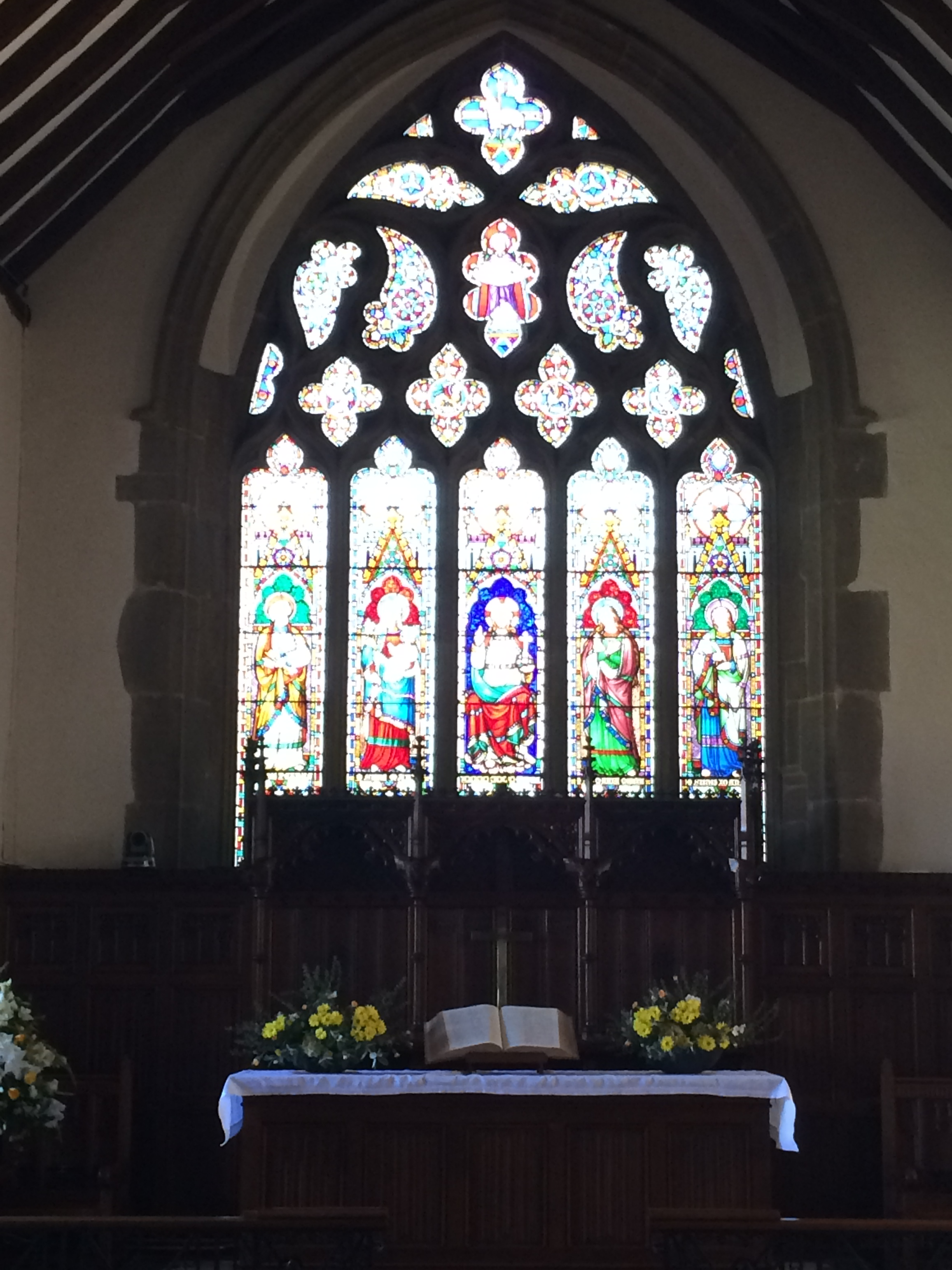
Decorated bar tracery, All Saints Church, Lindfield, east window. A row of soufflets at the bottom, with mouchettes above and another soufflet at the top.

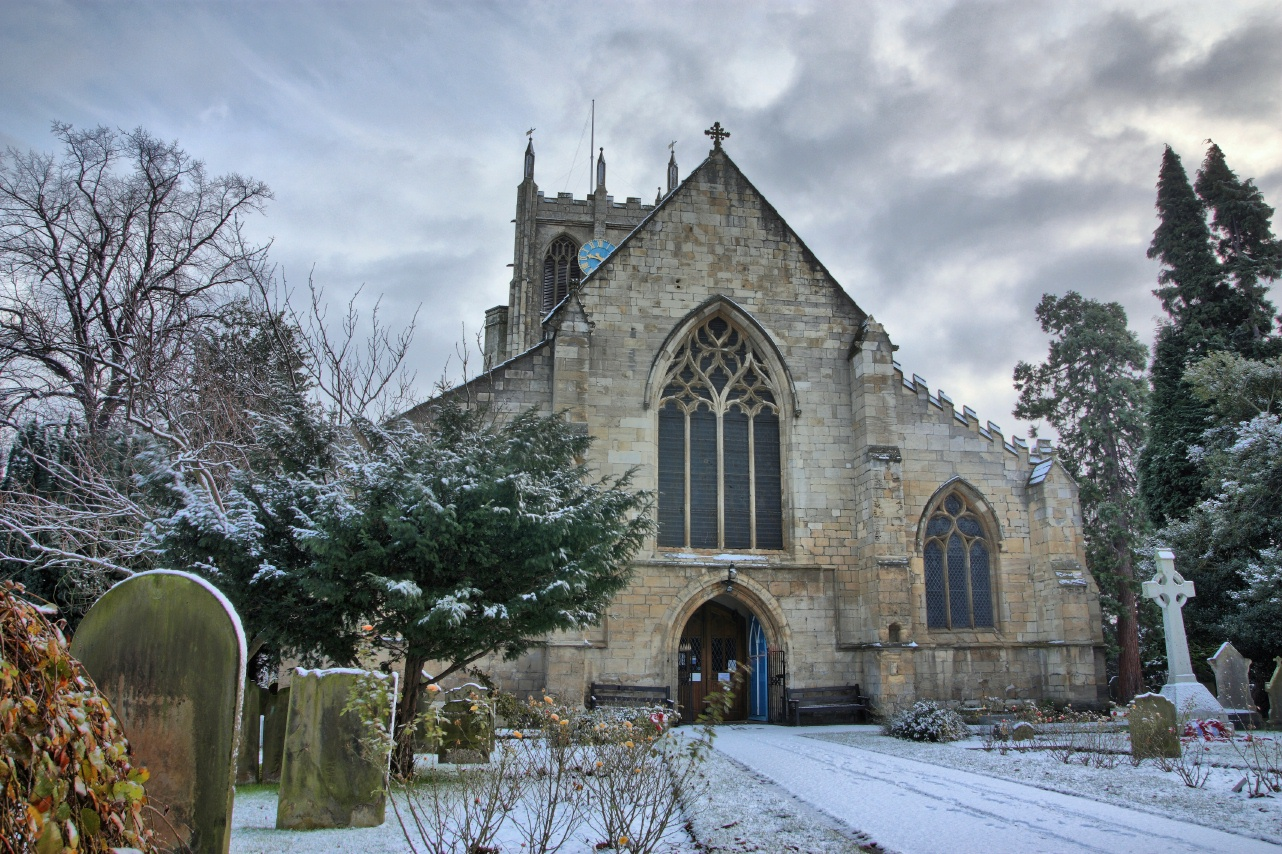
Curvilinear bar tracery, Cottingham, East Riding of Yorkshire, parish church

Second Pointed (14th century) saw Intersecting tracery elaborated with ogees, creating a complex reticular (net-like) design known as Reticulated tracery. Second Pointed architecture deployed tracery in highly decorated fashion known as Curvilinear and Flowing (Undulating). These types of bar tracery were developed further throughout Europe in the 15th century into the Flamboyant style, named for the characteristic flame-shaped spaces between the tracery bars. From the basic units of mouchettes (curving teardrops), daggers (straight teardrops) and soufflets (quatrefoils pointed at two ends) an almost infinite variety of complex patterns could be formed.

Starting in the late 13th century and at the beginning of the 14th century, tracery took on more fluid characteristics. A common shape used in curvilinear tracery was that of the ogee, which was too weak for structural application and was instead used as a decorative element. The use of the ogee in curvilinear tracery can be seen in the west window of St Mary's parish church in Cottingham, East Riding of Yorkshire. Several cathedrals have very elaborate curvilinear windows, like the east window at Carlisle and the west window at York, which forms a heart pattern.

==== Reticulated tracery ====
A secondary type, considered related to curvilinear tracery, is called reticulated tracery. Reticulated tracery fills the head of the arch with repeated soufflet forms creating a net-like pattern.

=== Perpendicular ===
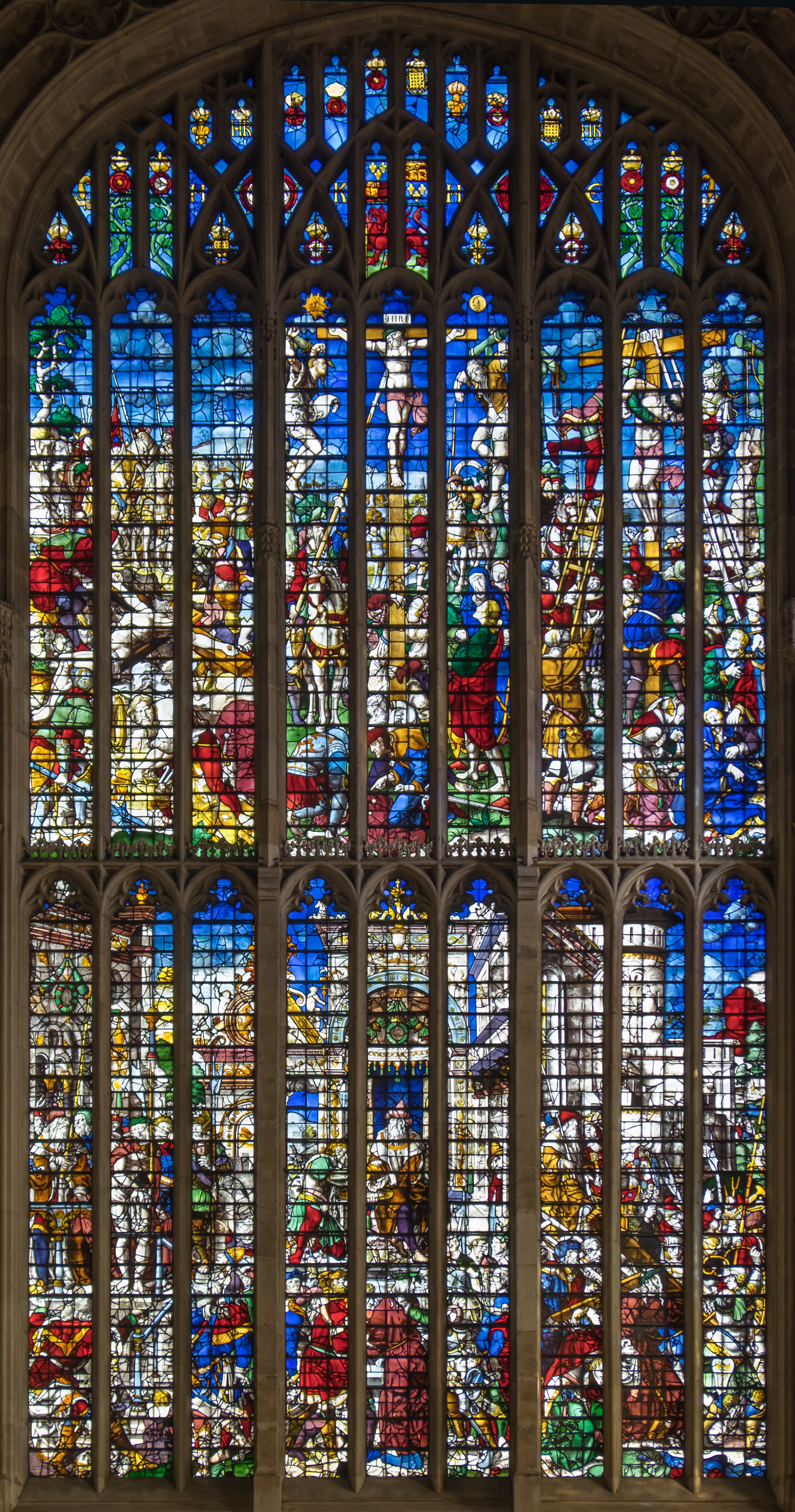
Perpendicular bar tracery, King's College Chapel, Cambridge, great east window

Perpendicular Gothic developed in England from the mid-14th century and is typified by Rectilinear tracery (panel-tracery). The mullions are often joined by transoms and continue up their straight vertical lines to the top of the window's main arch, some branching off into lesser arches, and creating a series of panel-like lights. Perpendicular strove for verticality and dispensed with the Curvilinear style's sinuous lines in favour of unbroken straight mullions from top to bottom, transected by horizontal transoms and bars, forming an angular grid. There were two main types of Perpendicular tracery: panel (or supermullioned) tracery consisted of a simple grid of mullions and transoms, while alternate tracery was a straightening of reticulated tracery, formed of tessellating hexagons. Panel tracery was more common in the east, and alternate in the south-west. Both types could be elaborated with larger arch patterns, termed subarcuation, as at King's College Chapel, Cambridge, York Minster, Beverley Minster and Cartmel Priory. Four-centred arches were used in the 15th and 16th centuries to create windows of increasing size with flatter window-heads, often filling the entire wall of the bay between each buttress. The windows were themselves divided into panels of lights topped by pointed arches struck from four centres. The transoms were often topped by miniature crenellations. The windows at King's College Chapel (1446–1515) represent the heights of Perpendicular tracery.

== Blind and open tracery ==
As bar tracery opened the way for more complex patterns, masons started applying those same patterns to other surfaces as well as the actual window openings. When used on an otherwise solid walls, such motifs are known as blind tracery, a decorative effect first applied on the west facade of the church of St Nicaise at Reims (1230s). Conversely, tracery was also constructed as openwork screens, which could either match the window tracery behind them (e.g. the Basilica of Saint Urbain, Troyes) or create a visual counterpoint to it, as on the exterior of the west facade of Strasbourg Cathedral. Open tracery in particular was a key feature of the later phases of Rayonnant and Flamboyant Gothic.

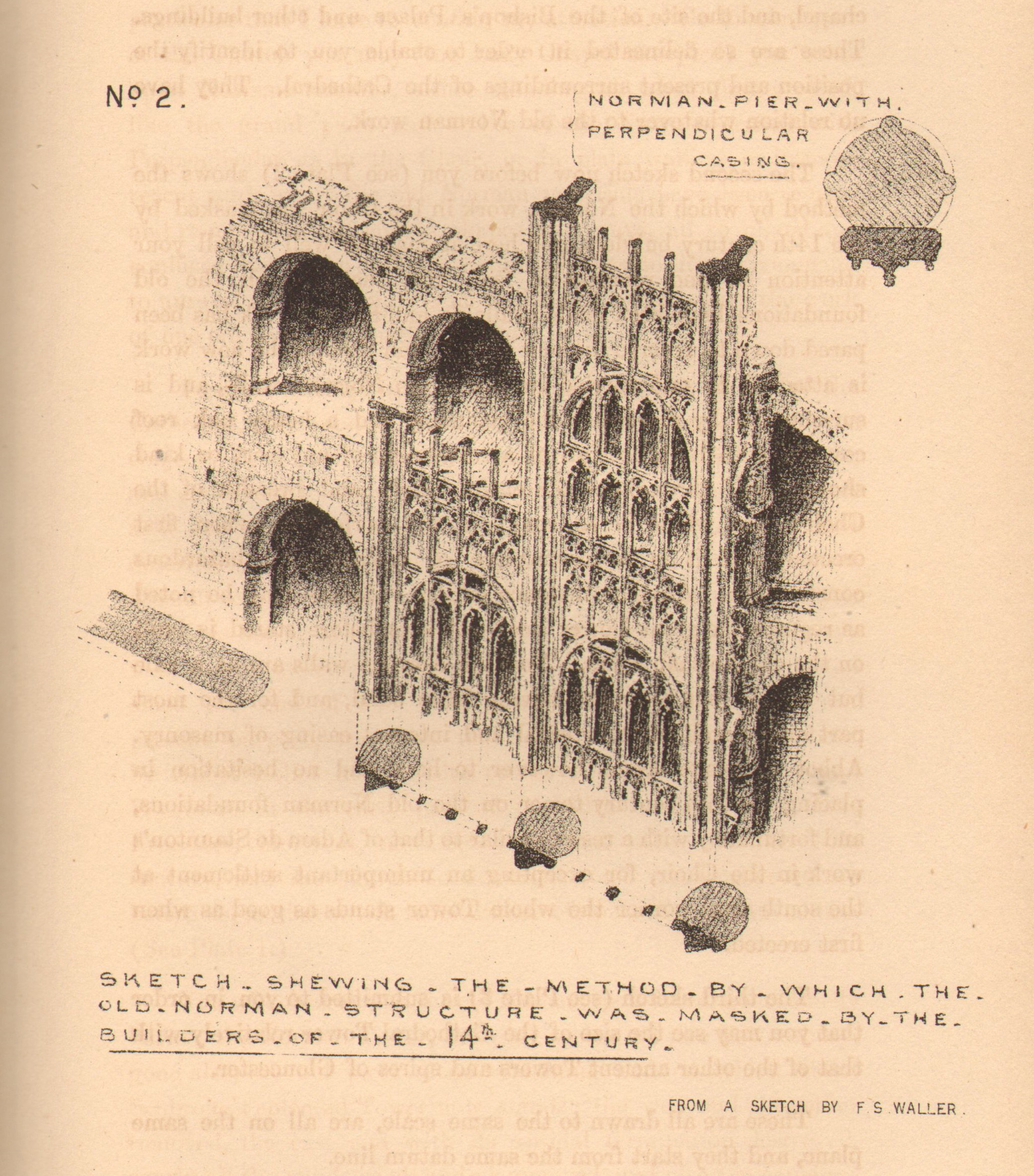
The construction of Gloucester cathedral, showing how blind tracery conceals the earlier Norman building.

In English Perpendicular Gothic, a grid of tracery panels could extend over walls and windows alike, making them part of a decorative whole. Gloucester Cathedral is the earliest and most prominent surviving example of this, with blind tracery divorcing the aisles from the main building. Blind tracery panels could also cover fan vaults, unifying them with the walls, again as at Gloucester.

== Tracery patterns ==
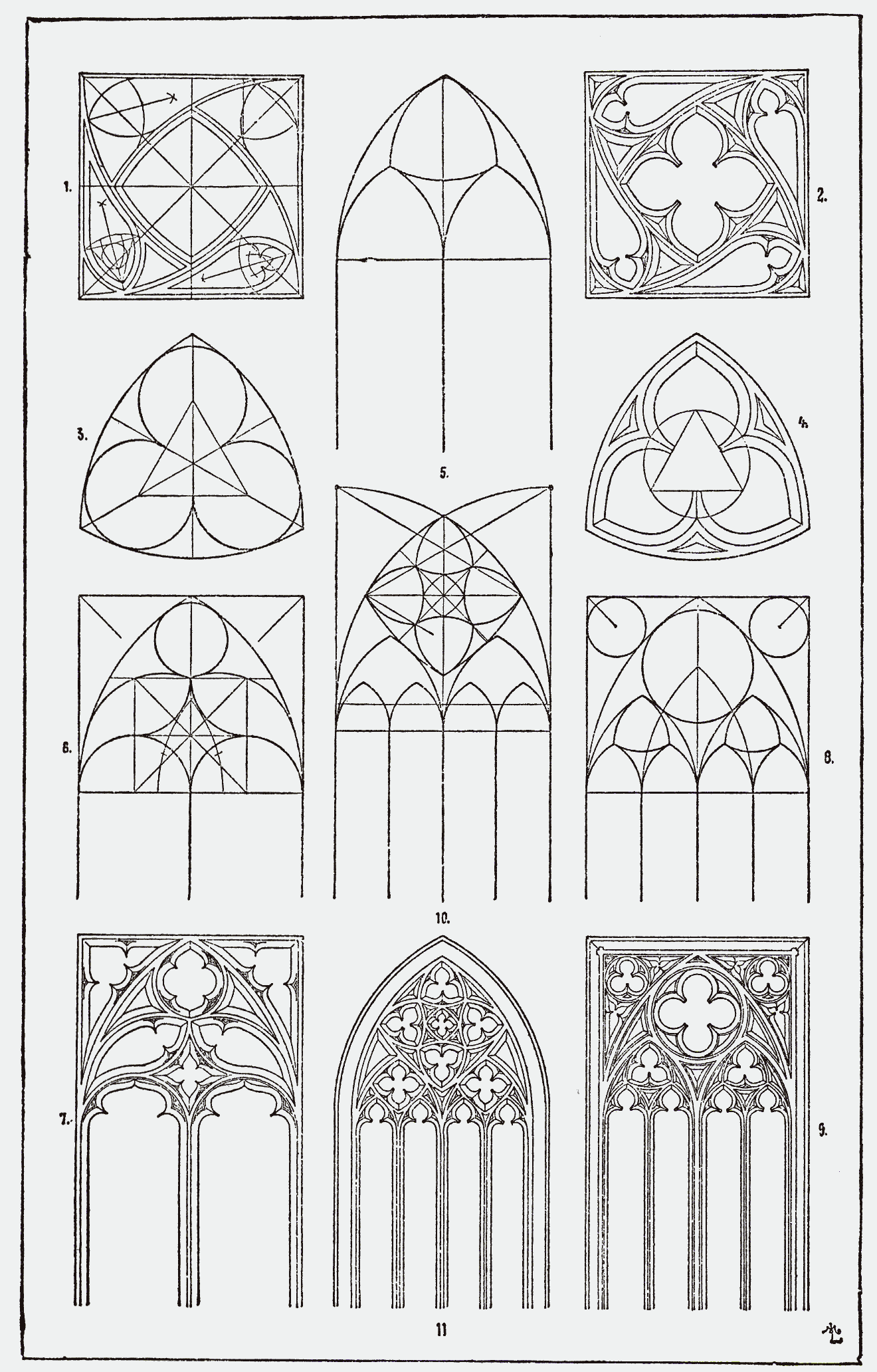
Tracery and its design in A Handbook of Ornament by Franz Sales Meyer (1898)

Most 19th-century histories of Gothic architectural style used a series of typological categories based on the evolution of the dominant patterns of window tracery. In terms of the overall development of Gothic architecture, the crucial development was not so much the use of any particular tracery patterns but the transition from plate to bar tracery, which was what made the Rayonnant and subsequent styles possible. To construct traceries proportionately it is important to use the basis of geometry to help create correct angles for the design.

=== Rounded quatrefoils ===
In Gothic tracery, rounded quatrefoils have been used in modern industrial ornament which is used to embellish different parts of a building or certain objects. This is formed with the use of squares as the base and then constructing circles tangent to each side of the square in the center of the side as well as a tangent to each of the circle's sides. This type of construction is used generously in Gothic buildings. For instance, rounded quatrefoils were used in tiled pavements like the ones in the Gloucester Cathedral or in Great Malvern, Worcestershire, England. It was also common in the work of the Chinese and Japanese.

=== Rounded multifoils ===
Rounded multifoils are found in different parts of Gothic buildings such as circular windows and pointed windows containing circular lights. These designs can have rings ranging from seven to eleven small circles. They are often seen in England but have become quite popular in French Gothic architecture. This design has been used since medieval times in tiles used in Gothic buildings. The tile pavement used in Jervaulx Abbey in Yorkshire, England, had rings of six and twelve circles inside another circle.

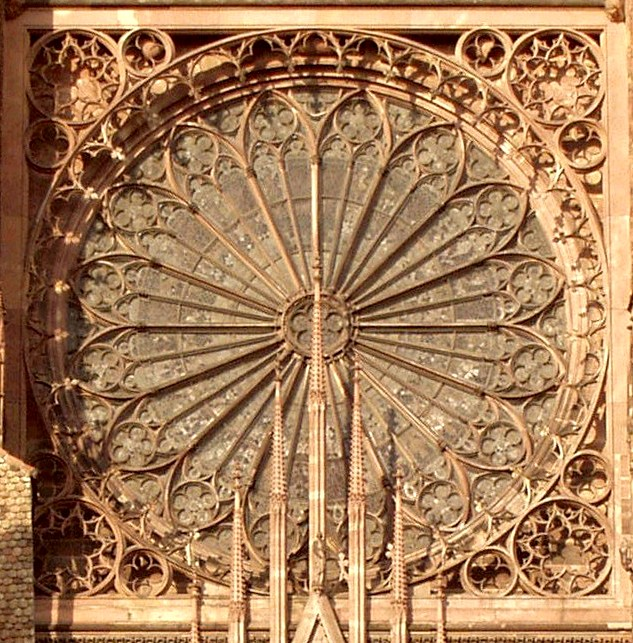
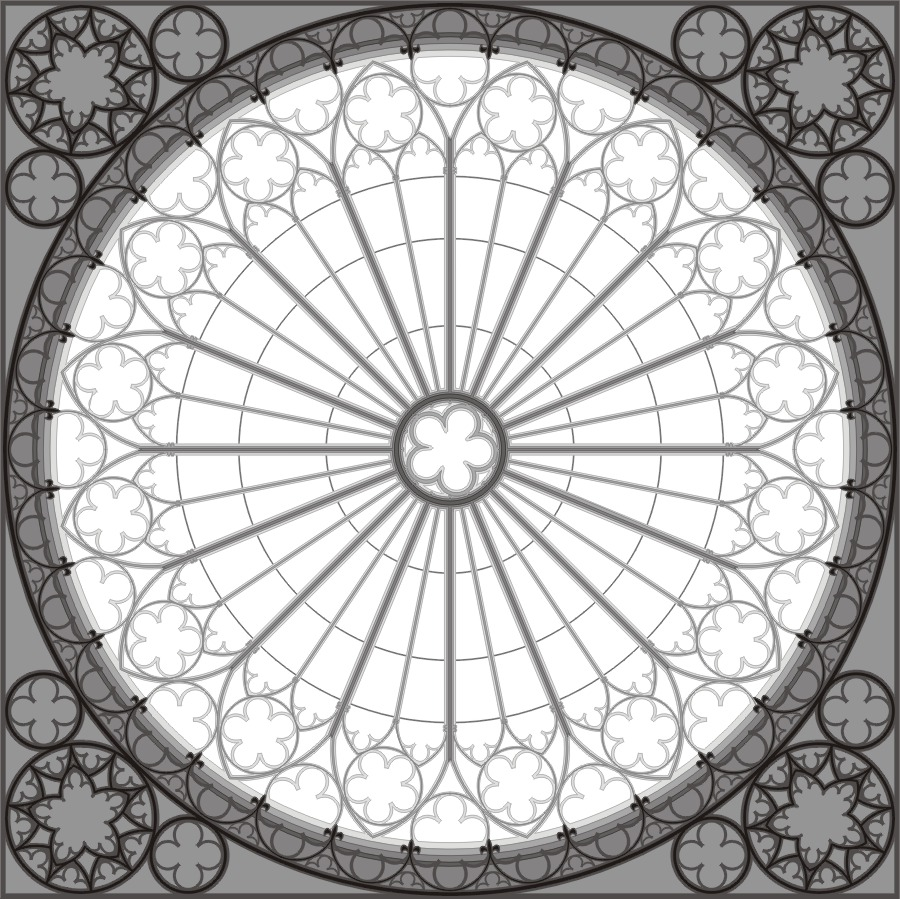
Rayonnant rose window of Strasbourg Cathedral's west front, showing the open tracery screen, and its schematic

== Tracing floors and épures ==
As the complexity of tracery increased, so did the need for masons to draw out their designs in advance, either as a way of experimenting with patterns or as a way of communicating their designs to other craftsmen or to their patrons. Because of the cost and size limitations of parchment sheets, such designs would normally be drawn by incising onto a whitewashed board or a conveniently placed section of flat wall. In the latter case, the wall would be prepared with a thin layer of plaster, which would show the design more clearly.

A number of churches and cathedrals still show the faint remains of these tracings (or épures as they are known in France), from where the mason's compass points scratched through the plaster and into the masonry below. (Examples include some experimental 14th-century window tracery patterns at the eastern end of the south wall inside the Galillee porch of Ely Cathedral, or the extensive series of tracings on the flat aisle roofs of Clermont-Ferrand Cathedral.) A number of major building sites (including Westminster Abbey, Wells Cathedral and York Minster) originally had dedicated tracery chambers, where the architects could prepare their designs in relative comfort. The availability of a large flat floor surface meant that designs could be drawn life-size and the individual elements of bar tracery laid out on the plan to test their goodness of fit, before hoisting them up the scaffolding for installation in the actual window openings. This also meant that masons could carry on working through the winter season, when building work would normally grind to a halt.

The tracing floors themselves were covered with plaster-of-Paris, which could be relaid and smoothed down after each set of designs were finished with. The 14th-century tracing house at York (also known as the Mason's Loft) survives on the upper storey of the corridor leading to the Chapter House, the complex web of lines and curves scratched into the floor show the countless designs that were worked out in there. The high-quality carpentry and the inclusion of a garderobe and fireplace in the York tracing house also indicate the rising status of the architect around the 14th century.

== See also ==
- Branchwork using tree branch forms, late northern Gothic
- Church window
- Foil (architecture)
- French Gothic stained glass windows
- Rosette (design)
- Stained glass
- Three hares
