= Foil (architecture) =

Leaf-like pattern produced by overlapping circles of equal size

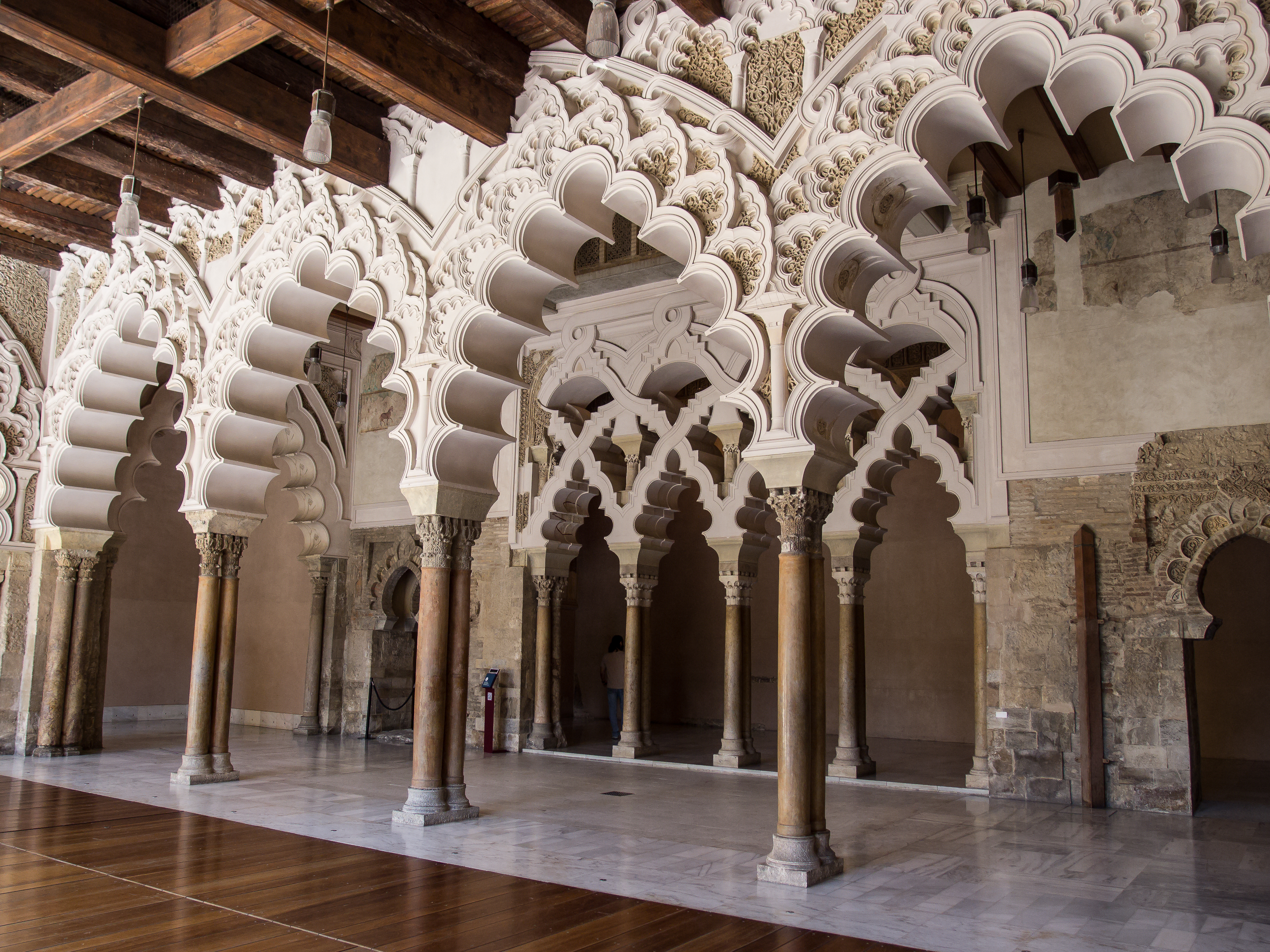
Multifoil arches in Aljafería, Zaragoza, Spain

In architecture, a foil (from Latin folium 'leaf') is a type of decorative element based on a symmetrical rendering of leaf shapes, defined by overlapping circles of the same diameter that produce a series of cusps to make a lobe. Typically, the number of cusps can be three (trefoil), four (quatrefoil), five (cinquefoil), or a larger number (multifoil).

Foil motifs may be used as part of the heads and tracery of window lights, complete windows themselves, the underside of arches, in heraldry, within panelling, and as part of any decorative or ornamental device. Foil types are commonly found in Gothic and Islamic architecture.

Foil type examples

Trefoil

Quatrefoil

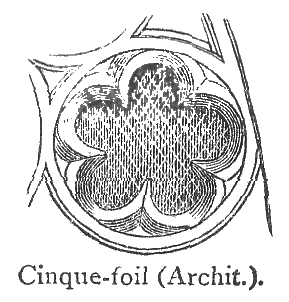
Cinquefoil

== See also ==
- Heraldry
- Tracery
