= Eichstätt Cathedral =

Coordinates: 48°53′31″N 11°11′01″E

- Cathedral of Our Lady, St Willibald and St Salvator of Horta
- Eichstätt Dom
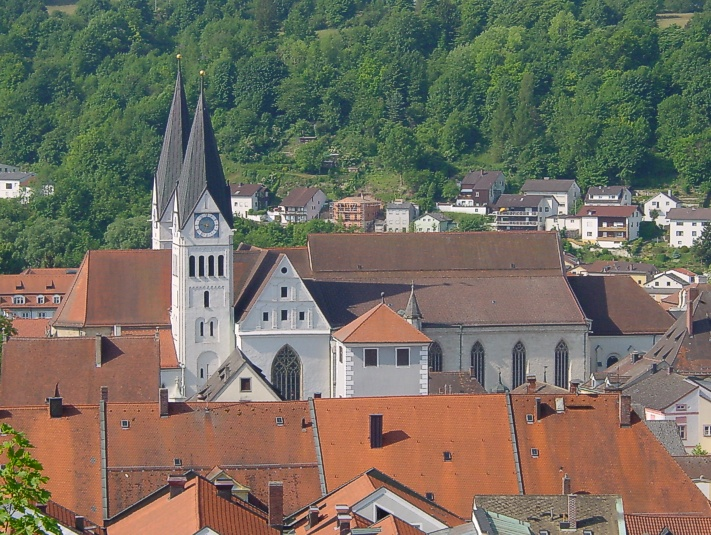
- Eichstätt Cathedral
- Eichstätt Cathedral
- Location: Eichstätt
- Country: Germany
- Denomination: Roman Catholic

History
- Status: Active
- Founded: 8th century

Architecture
- Functional status: Cathedral

Administration
- Diocese: Diocese of Eichstätt

Clergy
- Bishop: Gregor Maria Franz Hanke

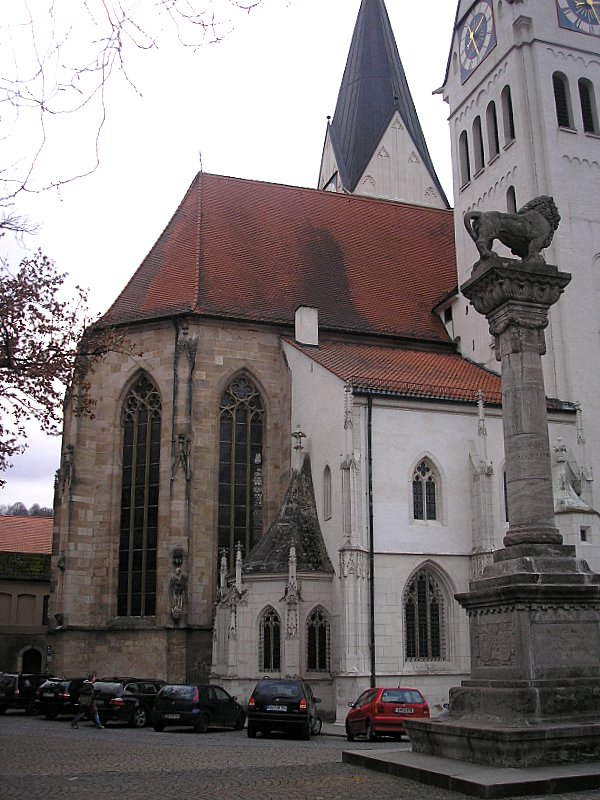
Dom Eichstaett Ostchor

Eichstätt Cathedral, properly known as the Cathedral Church of the Blessed Virgin Mary, St. Willibald and St. Salvator is the 11th-century cathedral of the Catholic Diocese of Eichstätt and is located in the city of Eichstätt, in the state of Bavaria, in Southern Germany.

== History ==
The first Catholic cathedral of Our Lady and Sts. Willibald and Salvator in Eichstätt was built in the 8th century. The current building is 98 metres (322 feet) long. Together with the cloister and the mortuary, the two-aisled cathedral is regarded as one of the most important medieval monuments in Bavaria.

== Bells ==
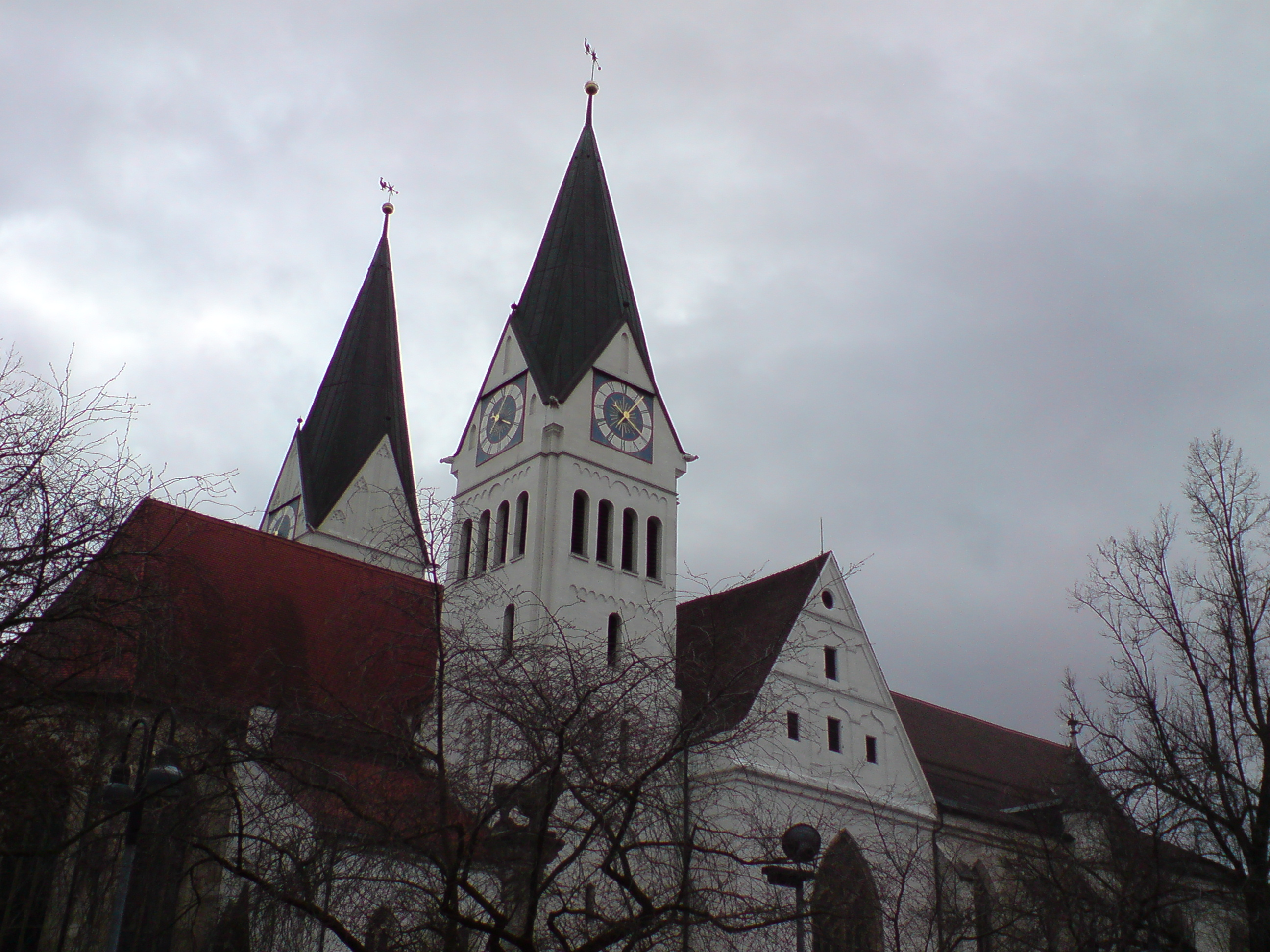
Eichstätt Cathedral

The cathedral has a collection of 18 bells, making it one of the churches with the most bells in Germany. The bells are distributed between the north and south tower and are not rung together, but in four separate groups.

=== Main Peal ===
The oldest bell in the peal is dedicated to Mary, mother of Jesus, (German: Frauenglocke) and dates from the beginning of the 14th century. The bell named Hallerin was cast by Nuremberg master Hans Glockengießer in 1540. The Magnificat bell of 1975 is also known as the Bishop's Bell (German: Bistumsglocke). The Benedict Bell was donated by church musician Wolfram Menschick.

Number	Dedication	Strike tone (a′ = 435 Hz)	Mass (kg, ca.)	Diameter (mm)	Year of casting	Foundry location
1	Trinity	a^{0} +^{1}/_{16}	5.300	1.930	1976	Heidelberg
2	Christ, Hallerin	c^{1} +^{1}/_{16}	3.800	1.775	1540	Nuremberg
3	John the Baptist	d^{1} +^{1}/_{16}	2.321	1.500	1975	Heidelberg
4	Our Lady	e^{1} +^{6}/_{16}	1.750	1.370	14th Century	Nuremberg
5	Saint Joseph	g^{1} +^{1}/_{16}	947	1.100	1975	Heidelberg
6	Magnificat, Bistumsglocke	a^{1} +^{2}/_{16}	771	1.010	2002	Passau
7	Cecilia	h^{1} +^{1}/_{16}	692	963	1967	Heidelberg
8	Boniface	c^{2} +^{1}/_{16}	554	910	1975	Heidelberg
9	Gundekar	d^{2} +^{1}/_{16}	385	800	1975	Heidelberg
10	Francis Xavier	e^{2} +^{1}/_{16}	276	710	1975	Heidelberg

=== North Tower ===
Dedication	Strike tone (a′ = 435 Hz)	Mass (kg, ca.)	Diameter (mm)	Year of casting	Foundry location
Ave Maria	a^{1} +^{3}/_{16}	750	1.030	um 1500	Nuremberg
Choir	c^{2} +^{3}/_{16}	500	880	16th Century	Nuremberg
Mary	d^{2} ±0	230	700	1671	Ingolstadt
Benedict	f^{2} +^{9}/_{16}	105	560	2005	Passau

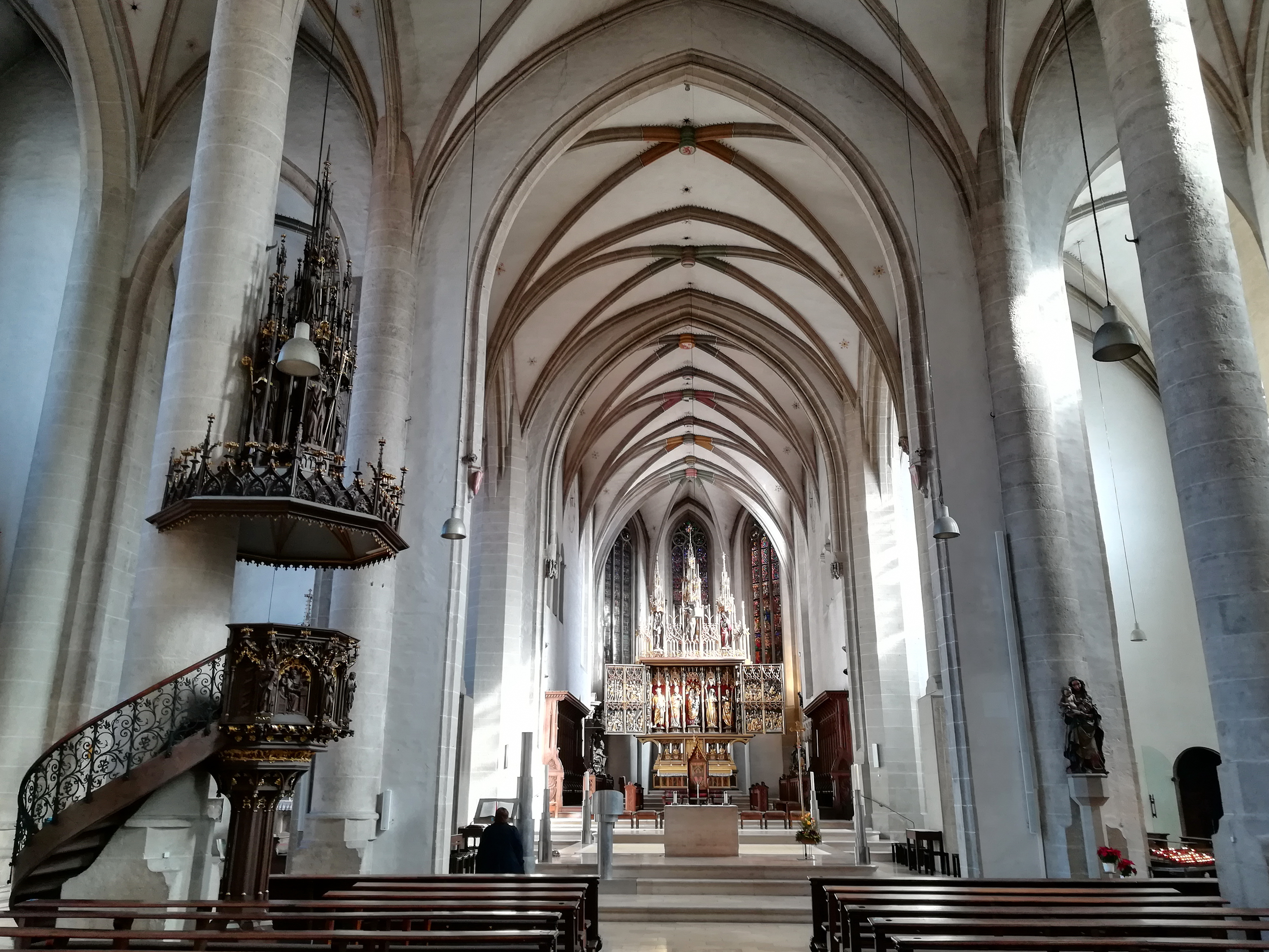
Dom Eichstätt Innenraum

=== South Tower ===
The two bells of 1256 have a very characteristic sound, resulting from their special rib bell shape (German: Rippe). Two bells are rung for weekday vespers, one bell each for rosary devotions, and every Friday at 11 o'clock for the Passion of Christ.

Dedication	Strike tone (a′ = 435 Hz)	Mass (kg, ca.)	Diameter (mm)	Year of casting	Foundry location
Willibald	f^{1} +^{2}/_{16}	1.300	1.255	1256	Würzburg
Mary	g^{1} +^{8}/_{16}	900	1.120	1299	Nuremberg
Mary	as^{1} +^{6}/_{16}	550	961	1256	Würzburg

=== Death Bell ===
In the North Tower is the Death Bell (German: Sterbeglocke), known as Klag, which is only rung to commemorate the death of a member of the cathedral community. It was probably cast by Hermann Kessler at the beginning of the 14th century and has a strike tone of a″ +^{1}/_{16}. It weighs about 120 kilograms (260 lb) and has a diameter of 56 centimetres (22 in).

== Museum ==
Attached to the cathedral is a museum named Cathedral Treasury and Diocesan Museum.

== Burials ==
- St Willibald's tomb
- Joseph Schröffer
