= Wolfram Menschick =

- Born: 28 October 1937; Pielenhofen, Germany
- Died: 8 December 2010 (aged 73); Eichstätt Germany
- Education: University of Music and Performing Arts Munich
- Occupations: Church musician; Composer; Bell Expert; Academic teacher
- Organizations: Eichstätt Cathedral; Diocese of Eichstätt; University of Music and Performing Arts Munich
- Awards: Order of the Holy Sepulchre; Order of St. Gregory the Great; Pontifical Institute of Sacred Music

Wolfram Menschick (28 October 1937 – 8 December 2010) was a German Catholic church musician, composer and academic teacher. From 1969 to 2002 he was responsible for the church music at Eichstätt Cathedral, also serving the Diocese of Eichstätt as music director and organ expert. He was a bell expert, a member of a national council. From 1986 to 2000, he was a professor at the University of Music and Performing Arts Munich. His compositions, including 36 masses, are frequently performed.

== Life and career ==
Born in Pielenhofen, Menschick took his Abitur in Straubing and studied at the University of Music and Performing Arts Munich, conducting with Gotthold Ephraim Lessing, composition with Harald Genzmer, and organ with Franz Lehrndorfer.

While a student, he began work as a church musician at St. Konrad in Regensburg. In 1966, he became chorale conductor at St. Georg in Amberg. From 1969 to 2002, he was kapellmeister at the Eichstätt Cathedral, where he also served as director of church music for the Diocese of Eichstätt. He was also a professor of liturgical organ playing and chorale conducting at the University of Music and Performing Arts Munich from 1986 to 2000.

In the diocese, he was also the expert for bells (Glockensachverständiger) from 1970 to 2002, and in 1972 became a member of the German national council for bells (Beratungsausschuss für das Deutsche Glockenwesen), which was created ecumenically by the Catholic Bishops' Conference and the Protestant Church. In this position, he approved the bells of the restored Frauenkirche in Dresden. On the occasion of his 70th birthday in 2006, he donated a bell for the north tower of Eichstätt Cathedral, dedicated to Benedict of Nursia and also honouring Pope Benedict XVI, who was his friend (as was also the Pope's elder brother, the priest and musician Georg Ratzinger).

=== Organ planning ===
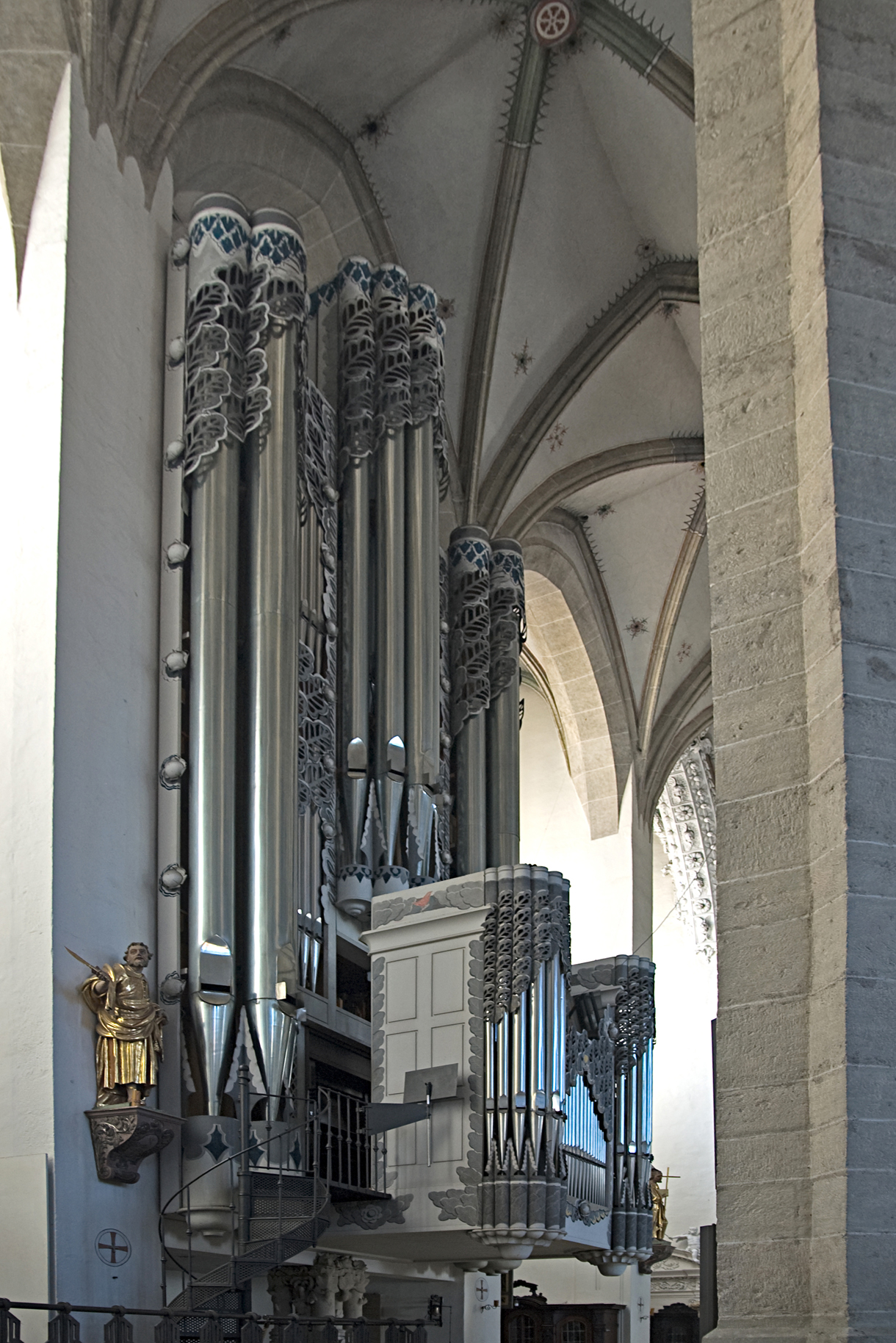
The Sandtner organ in Eichstätt Cathedral

As the organ expert of the Eichstätt diocese from 1969, he planned several instruments. He preferred Baroque organs with mechanical actions, such as his largest project, the organ built for Eichstätt Cathedral in 1975 by Sandtner.

=== Private life and death ===
Wolfram Menschick and his wife Roswitha had six daughters, including the author Roswitha Wildgans and the violin maker Julia Menschick.

Menschick died in Eichstätt in 2010 at age 73. The requiem was celebrated by Bishop Gregor Maria Hanke.

== Recordings ==
- Veni Domine – Der Eichstätter Domchor singt zur Weihnacht, choral music for Christmas, Jubilate-Verlag Eichstätt RM 101 OCLC 635347308
- Wolfram Menschick an der Eichstätter Domorgel, organ music, Jubilate-Verlag Eichstätt RM 102 OCLC 633751511
- Ubi caritas et amor, motet, in Ottilia Cappella – Himmelswege (Lieder vom Leben und von der Liebe), eos 2019 OCLC 1125346951

== Awards ==
Menschick was honoured as a member of the Order of the Holy Sepulchre. On his retirement, Bishop Walter Mixa, representing Pope John Paul II, named him a Komtur of the Order of St. Gregory the Great. In 2007, Eichstätt awarded him its citizen's medal. On 23 May 2008, he received an honorary doctorate from the Pontifical Institute of Sacred Music.

== Work ==
Menschick's choral sacred music is frequently performed. His works include:

- 36 masses
- Approximately 200 motets and settings of psalms, including extended psalms for soloists, choirs and orchestra
- an oratorio about John of God
- Johannespassion, a setting of the Passion after St John for three soloists and choir a cappella
- a Marian vespers for women's choir, congregation and organ, composed for a visit of Pope Benedict XVI in Altötting in 2007

Menschick continued composing in retirement, including in his final year, 2010, a Missa pro Papa dedicated to Pope Benedict XVI in June, and a motet for All Souls' Day.
