= Michael Rackl =

- Bishop of Eichstätt
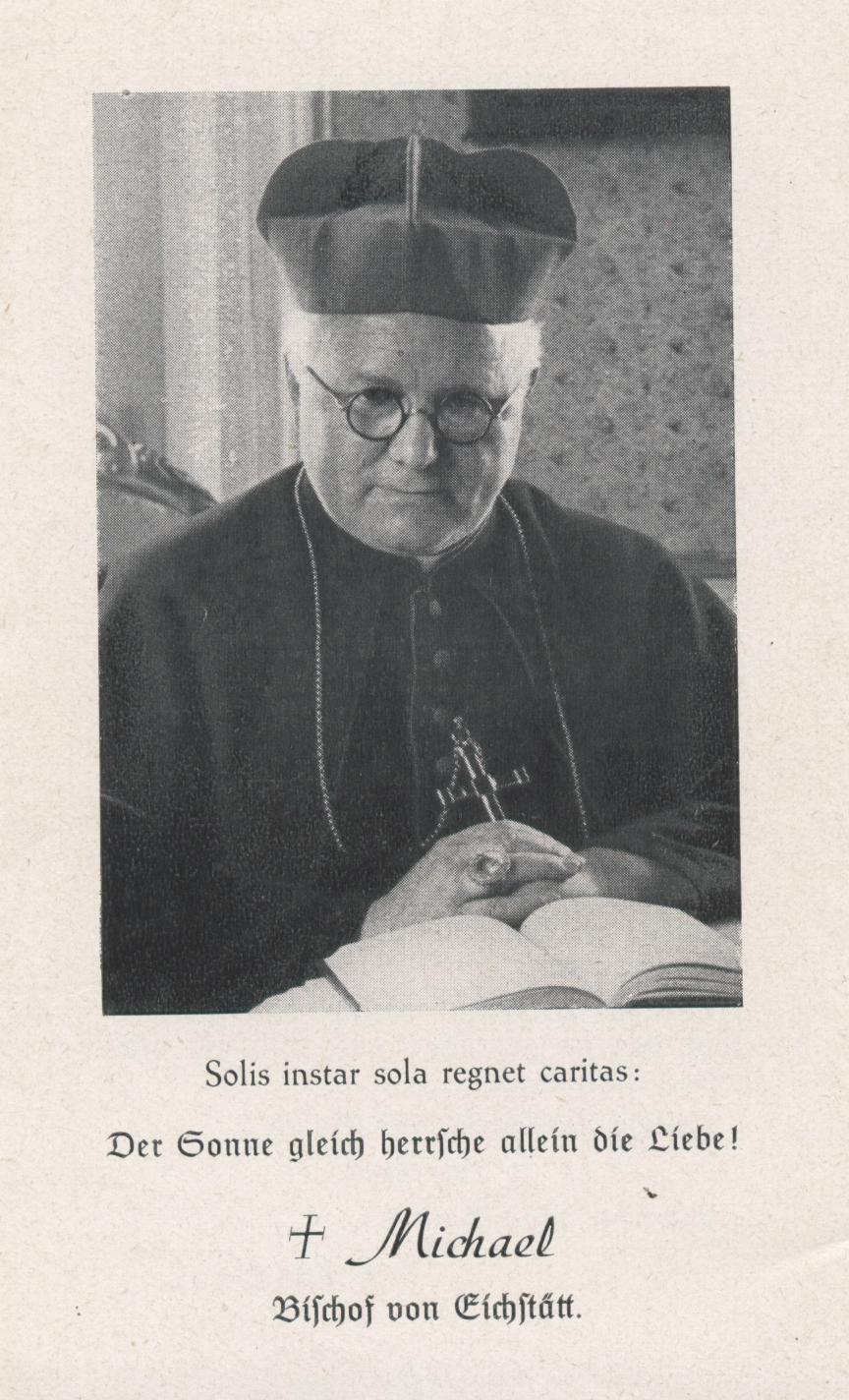
- Church: Catholic Church
- Diocese: Diocese of Eichstätt
- In office: 4 November 1935 – 5 May 1948
- Predecessor: Konrad von Preysing
- Successor: Joseph Schröffer

Orders
- Ordination: 29 June 1909
- Consecration: 21 December 1935 by Konrad von Preysing

Personal details
- Born: 31 October 1883 Rittershof, Neumarkt in der Oberpfalz, Kingdom of Bavaria, German Empire
- Died: 5 May 1948 (aged 64) Eichstätt, Bavaria, Bizone, Allied-occupied Germany
- Coat of arms

Michael Rackl (31 October 1883 – 5 May 1948) was Roman Catholic Bishop of Eichstätt from 1935 until his death in 1948.

He was born in Rittershof on 31 October 1883, the son of a wealthy farmer. He was the eldest of nine children, of which three were also religious. He graduated in 1904 and studied theology and philosophy at the Eichstätter Lyceum, graduating from the University of Freiburg in 1911 with a doctorate in dogmatics. Rackl was ordained a priest on 29 June 1909 at the age of 25 in Eichstätt by Cardinal Konrad von Preysing.

On 4 November 1935, aged 52, Rackl was appointed Bishop of Eichstätt, where he remained until his death in May 1948.

During the Second World War, Rackl allowed British Officers in a local prisoner-of-war camp to use the printing press of the diocese to produce a camp magazine entitled "Touchstone", which was notable for including three ghost stories by Alan Noel Latimer Munby.

In 1933, he signed the Vow of allegiance of the Professors of the German Universities and High-Schools to Adolf Hitler and the National Socialistic State. He was a priest for almost 39 years and a bishop for 12 years.

In 1936, Rackl declared that Catholicism and National Socialism were incompatible, having been at odds with the Nazis since his inauguration as bishop the year before. In April 1937, he defended a priest, Johann Kraus, who had been ordered to leave Eichstätt by the Nazis.
