= Church of St. James (Brno) =

Coordinates: 49°11′48.04″N 16°36′30.4″E

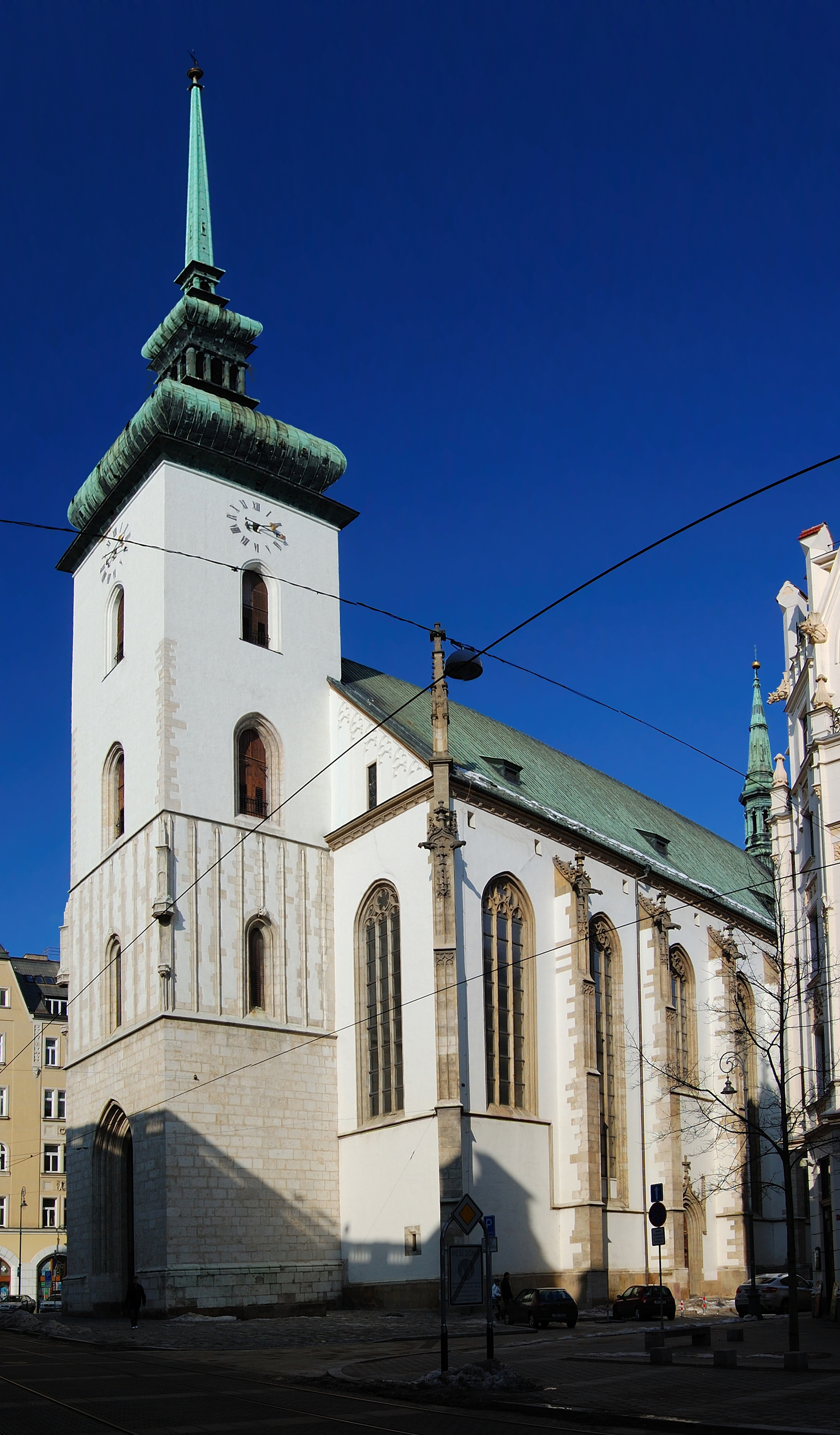
Church of St. James

Recording of the church bells from 1936

Church of St. James the Elder (Czech: kostel svatého Jakuba Staršího, German: St.-Jakobs-Kirche) is a late Gothic three-nave hall church situated in Jakubské náměstí, a square in the centre of Brno, Czech Republic. It is one of the largest, best-preserved Gothic churches in the Czech Republic. Its history starts at the beginning of the 13th century. The church has been protected as a national cultural monument since 1995.

== History ==
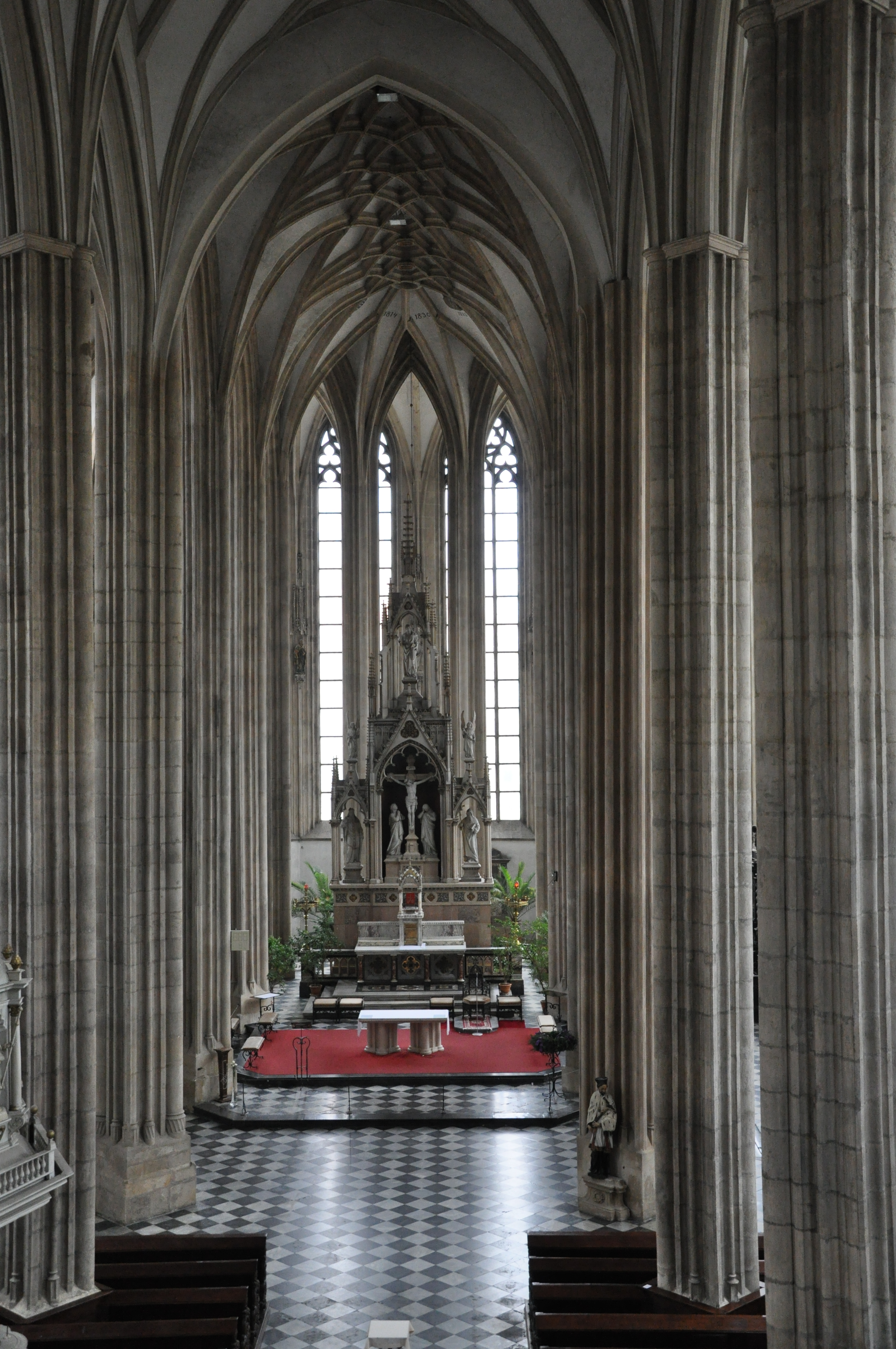
Main nave of the church

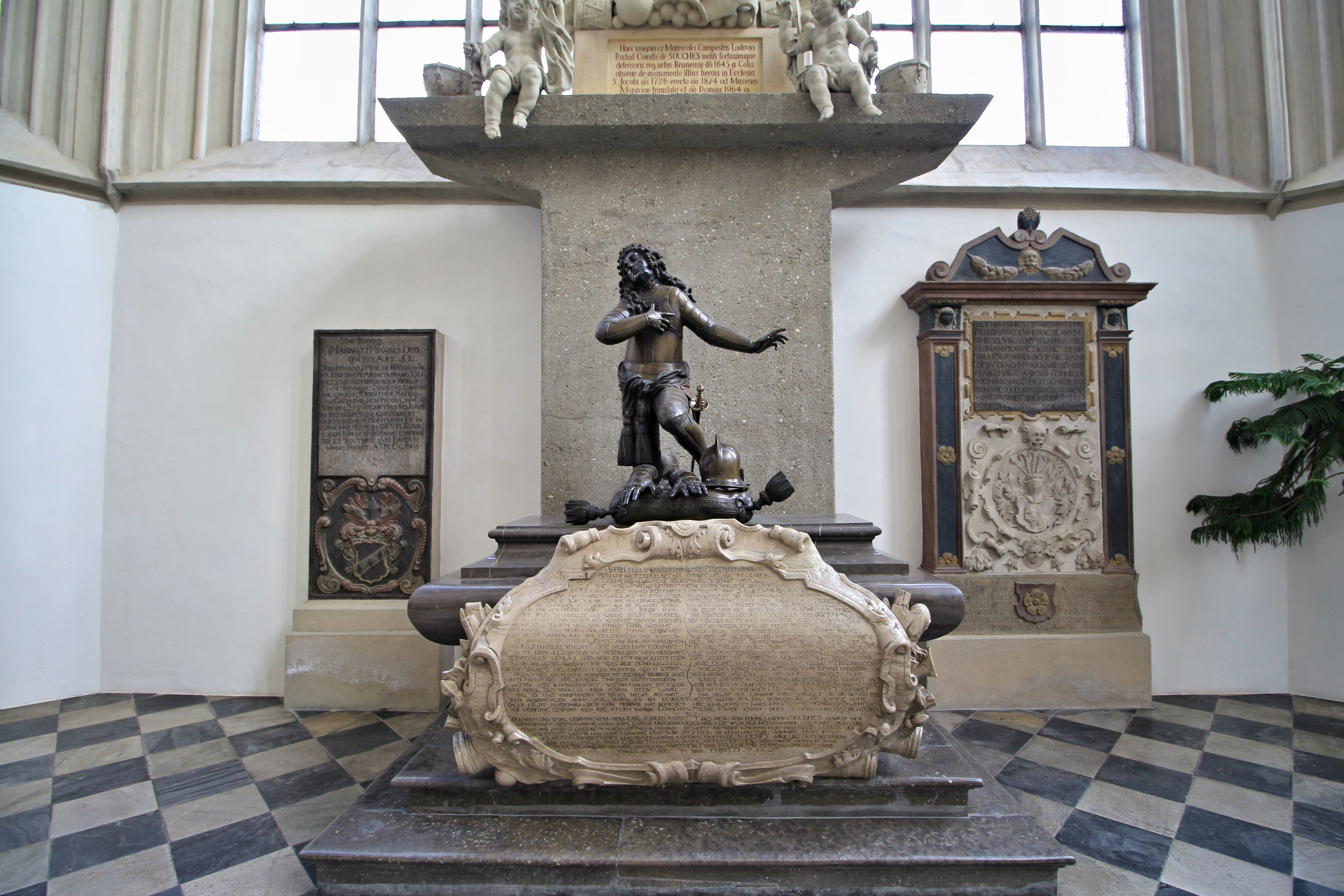
Tomb of Marshal Louis Raduit de Souches, hero of the Thirty Years' War

The church was founded for German inhabitants who lived in this part of the town in the 13th century. There is visible the painted heraldry of the Mother Superior of Oslavany Cistercian nunnery with the date 1220 on the vault of the presbytery. This date recalls the consecration of the smaller Romanesque church that stood here before this late Gothic Church of St. James; it served Flemish and German colonists. There are no remains of this church. There was a cemetery documented around the church in the 14th century, which was gradually extended in the following years.

From 1368 to 1405, some chapels were built around the church; these chapels created a unique urbanistic complex. The oldest one was Saint Maurice chapel from 1352, and among others were the chapel of Corpus Christi (1369), Saint Ursuline's chapel and the Assumption of the Virgin chapel (1413), the so-called New Chapel from the year 1428, Holy Trinity chapel (1463) and Saint Dorothy's chapel, which is in the cemetery (1465). The chapel of Corpus Christi was marked as being connected to the church. Brno citizens made gifts and bequests to these chapels. They also used to give contributions for building costs; however, the main burden of cost was borne by the Cistercian monastery in Oslavany.

== Structure ==
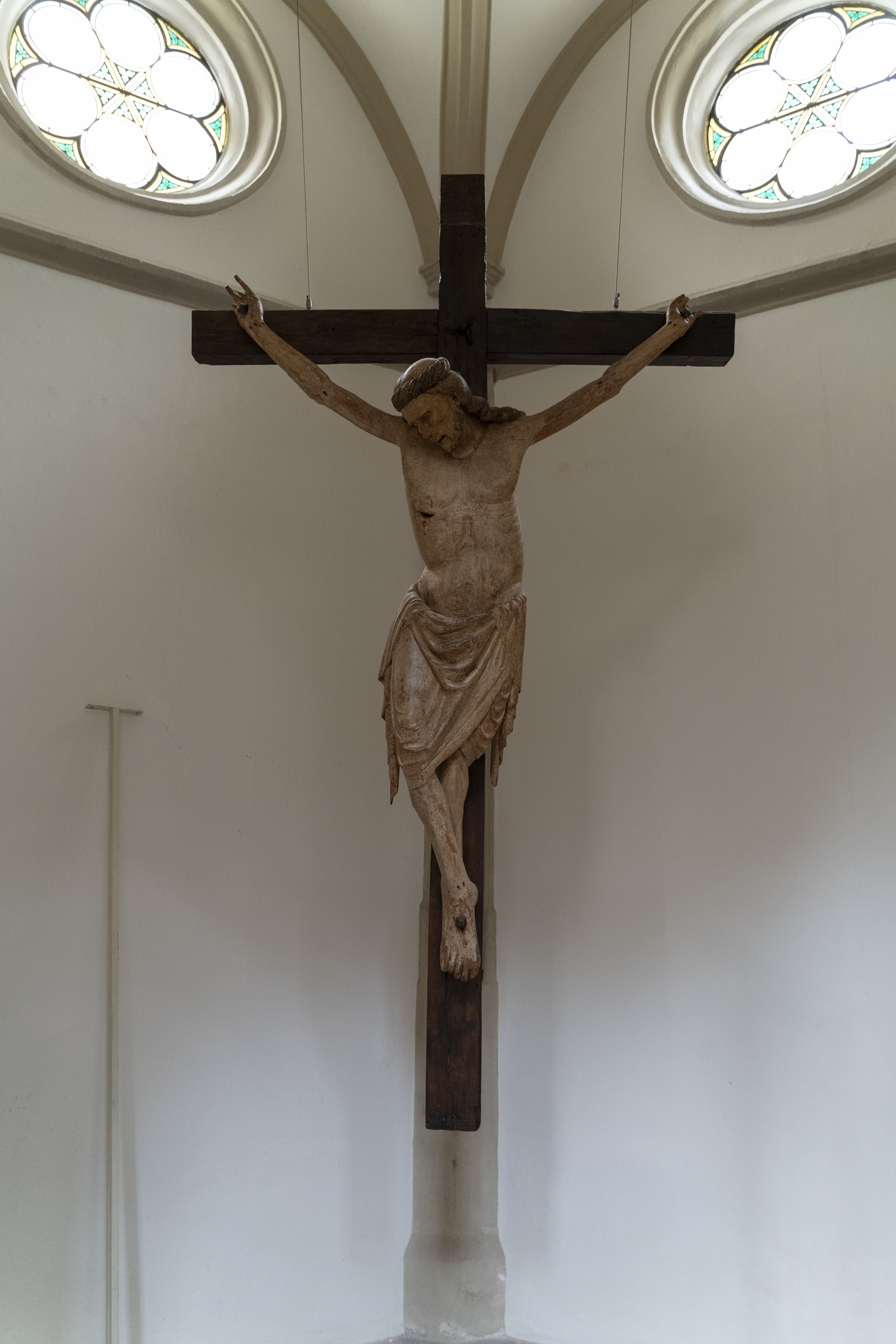
Crucifix around 1245

This hall church is characterized by a presbytery with an inner polygon, which is obviously the oldest part. There is a big tower standing at the western part of building. The tower has a main entrance door. The antechapel was constructed on the northern side.

Late Gothic construction of the parish church started with building up the choir in 1446. The builder in the late 1450s was probably Hans from Brno according to scientific research. The main problem is surely to find out the date when construction began, i.e. the date of establishing the East-oriented presbytery. There is a document about a gift for the construction of the chancel from the year 1469 and the latest research comes with differing opinions as to when construction on the presbytery began. It should date according to documents from the 15th century. This year probably refers to the finishing of the construction of the chancel. Another opinion puts forth the idea about the earlier construction of the oldest part of the presbytery. This idea is supported by some architectonic details, for example the axial placing of the buttresses which recall Petr Parléř's construction at the Southern Hall in St. Vitus Cathedral in Prague and in the presbytery of Saint Bartholomew in Kolín upon Elbe. Also the structure of the wall profile between the windows and the shape of the window tracery repeats some of Parléř's characteristic motifs and possibly floral ornaments and beautiful gargoyles at the top of the buttresses which are close to work from Parléř's area. It could be hardly made as special kind of historicism in the half of the 15th century. It is possible to consider the origin of the presbytery and so the project of the new church at the end of the 14th century. Norbert Nussbaum pointed out to details of the shaft work, which passes through the windows jambs and the compound piers. It shows knowledge of the forms, which were used in the lodge at the Cathedral of St. Stephan in Vienna, when there was a master Lorenz Spenning.

Petr Kroupa, who made research about the history of this church's construction, came to the conclusion that the presbytery was finished in 1473 and there are some similarities with the presbytery at the Church of the Holy Spirit in Heidelberg, where the same vaulting is used in the hall choir gallery. The vault belongs to the area of Swabia net vaults. Petr Kroupa considered Master Hans as a designer of Jacob's choir vault for as much as it was documented (as "Meister zu Brünn" - Master at Brno) at a stonecutters' meeting in Regensburg in 1459.

The antechapel was constructed on the northern side. There is a stone in this antechapel, which is marked by Anton Pilgram's stone sign and written text: "1502 Ist Angela/n/gen dy Seiten" (In 1502 they started building of side walls). It is known from documents that Anton Pilgram worked here in 1500 – 1511. Then he went to Vienna to work on the structure of Saint Stephen's Cathedral.

In 1515 the finished presbytery was affected by the fire that caused the roof to fall in and it subsequently destroyed all altars. The new main altar was consecrated in 1516. The stone relief called the Lamentation of Christ comes from the year 1518 and the relief of the Crucifixion is from 1519. The written marked date 1526 declares that the stone staircase up to the pulpit was finished in 1526. However, the pulpit acquired its present shape in 1669. Next covering in roof was probably done before 1530. The three-aisled roof was vaulted by the builder Pietro Gabri, who was an Italian who had settled in Brno, about 1570. The doubled stone staircase at the main tower with access into the choir was done in 1581. In the same year Wolf Nagel finished the choir. In 1692 Jakub Ryšák, who was an organ builder from Opava, delivered new organs.

The building of the churchtower begun in the 1520s and in 1592 Antonio Gabrin heightened the tower. He added the part with the clock, and the whole tower was finished by Šimon Tauch who put on the top the Renaissance canopy. The tower's height is 94 m. During the Thirty Years' War, the church was not damaged; so it was not necessary to rebuild it and thanks to this its predominantly florid Gothic shape has stayed conserved.

== Renovations ==
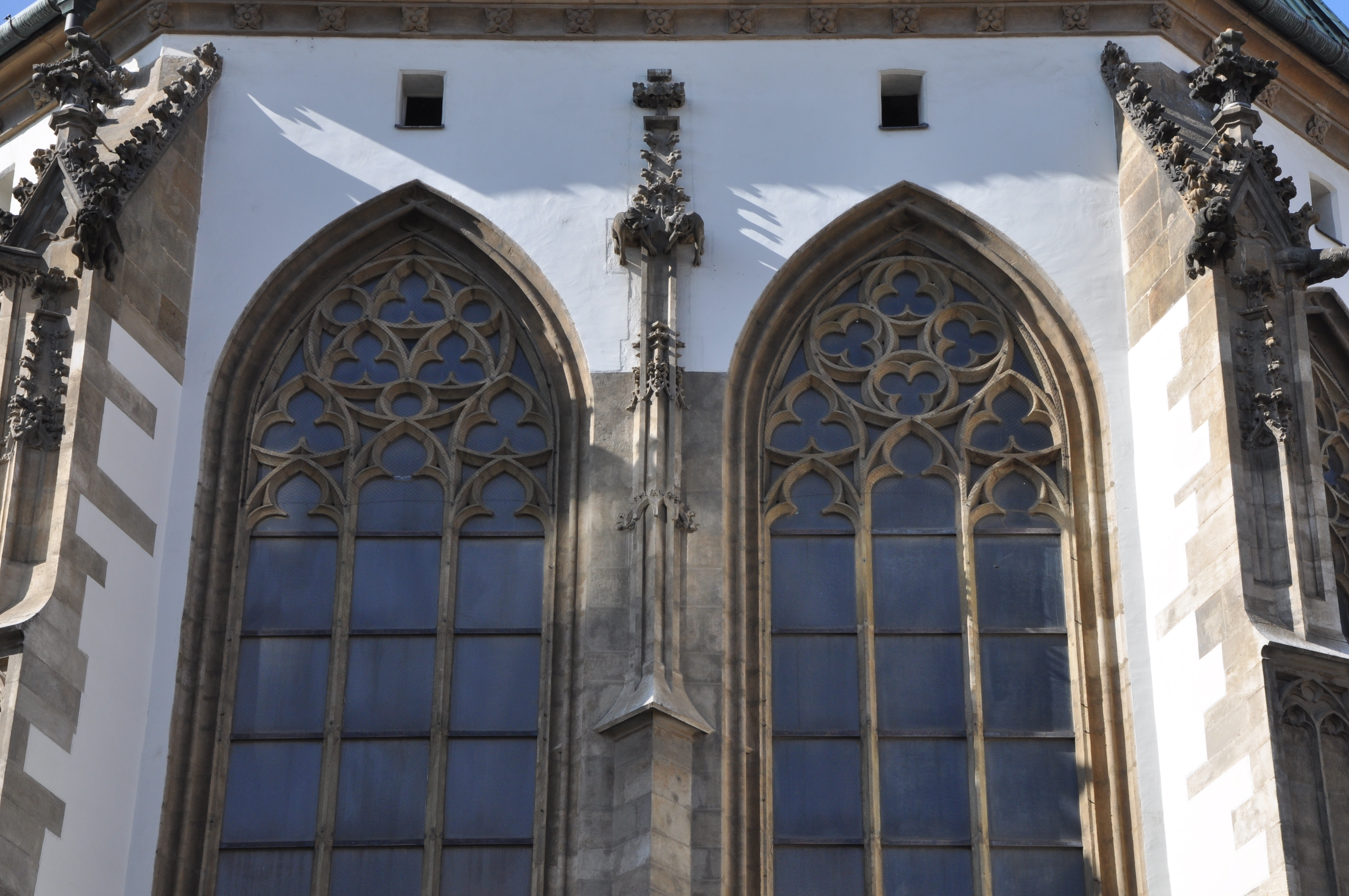
Gothic windows of Saint James' Church

The Baroque interior style was done in 1750–1766. During this rebuilding the older wooden altars were removed and replaced by new marble ones which are still there. In 1871–1879 the church was radically reconstructed into the Gothic Revival style led by Heinrich Ferstel. The outside additional buildings and their remnants were removed because they did not contribute to the church's garnish. Mr Ferstel removed the Gothic hall and the minor chapels in the south part of the church. He destroyed the above-mentioned Pilgram's work at the sacristy on the North side. He built a storey above the sacristy and gave it a new roof. Inside the church he removed all minor baroque Baroque and two galleries. The upper part of the outside buttresses with old gargoyles were replaced with new copies and stone architectural parts as phials, rosettes and flowers were replaced for the most part as well.

The blank Gothic windows on the South and North side were tapped. The parts of window flanning and tracery were also repaired properly. The Gothic Revival parsonage designed by Alois Prastorfer and Germano Wanderley was built in 1900–1901. The cemetery, which had been around the church, was cleared about the year of 1787 and the complex of above-mentioned chapels were demolished bit by bit together with it. Subsequently, a few gravestones were moved into the church and nowadays there are six of them.

In 2021, thanks to parish priest Václav Slouk, a comprehensive reconstruction of the temple was started. Due to leaks, for example, it was necessary to replace 2,500 m^{2} of copper roof sheathing, 9,000 post-World War II window panes with more suitable ones, repair stone linings, restore the organ, and repair or replace crumbling neo-Gothic gargoyles. The budget came to CZK 182 million. In June 2024, the church reopened after three years of closure during repairs. A tour was set up for tourists: in the rafters of the church there is an audiovisual light exhibition about the history of Brno and the Church of St. Jakub. The reconstruction of the tower and the opening of a new view of the city at a height of 43 metres should be completed in autumn 2024.

== Personalities baptized in the church ==
Georg Joseph Kamel (April 1661); Michael Czerny (July 1946), high-ranking cardinal in the Vatican Curia, prefect of the Dicastery for Promoting Integral Human Development; with some probability, also (in the oldest original building) Jobst of Moravia, King of Germany.

== Gallery ==
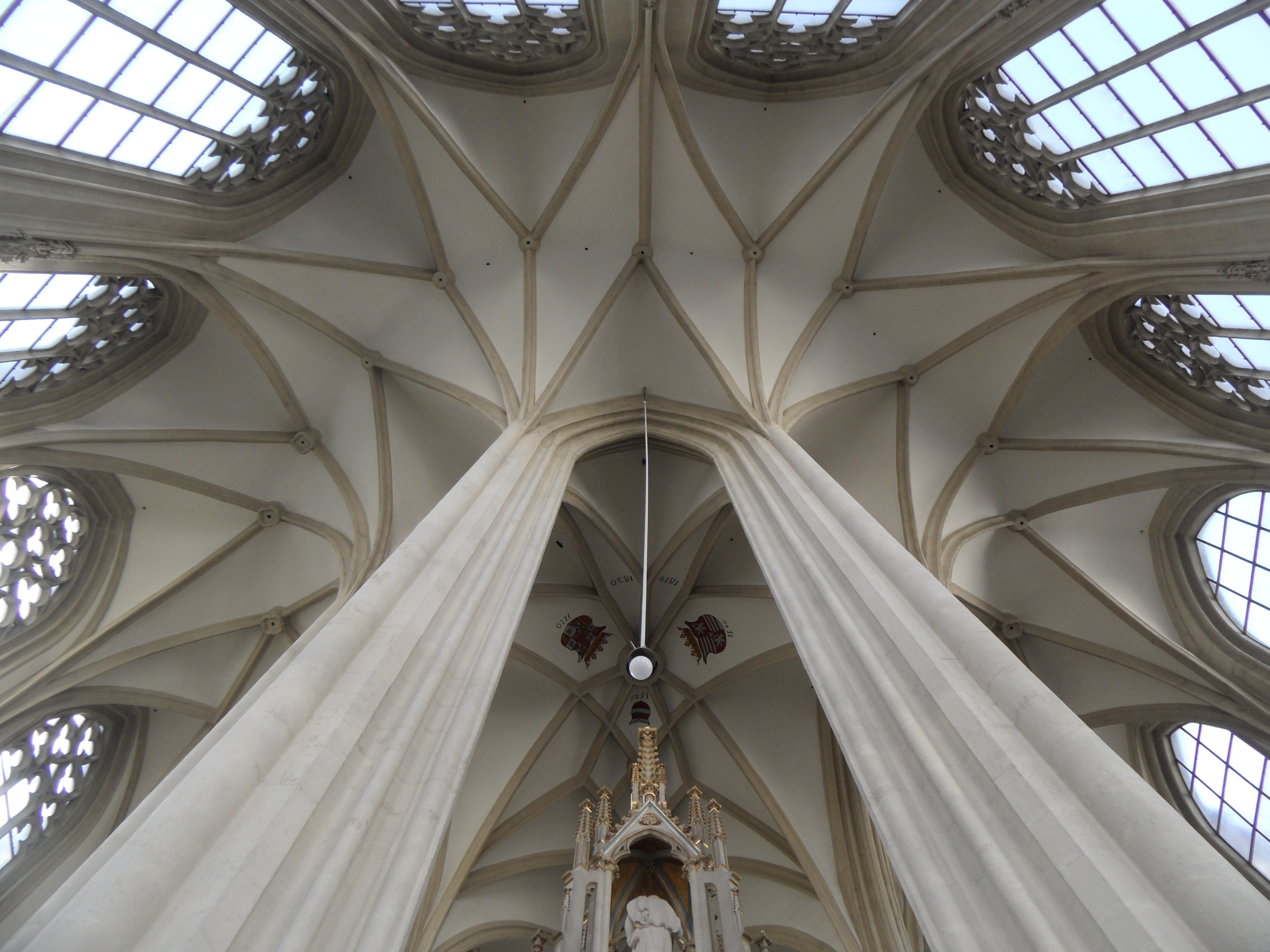
The vault system in ambulatory, 14th century

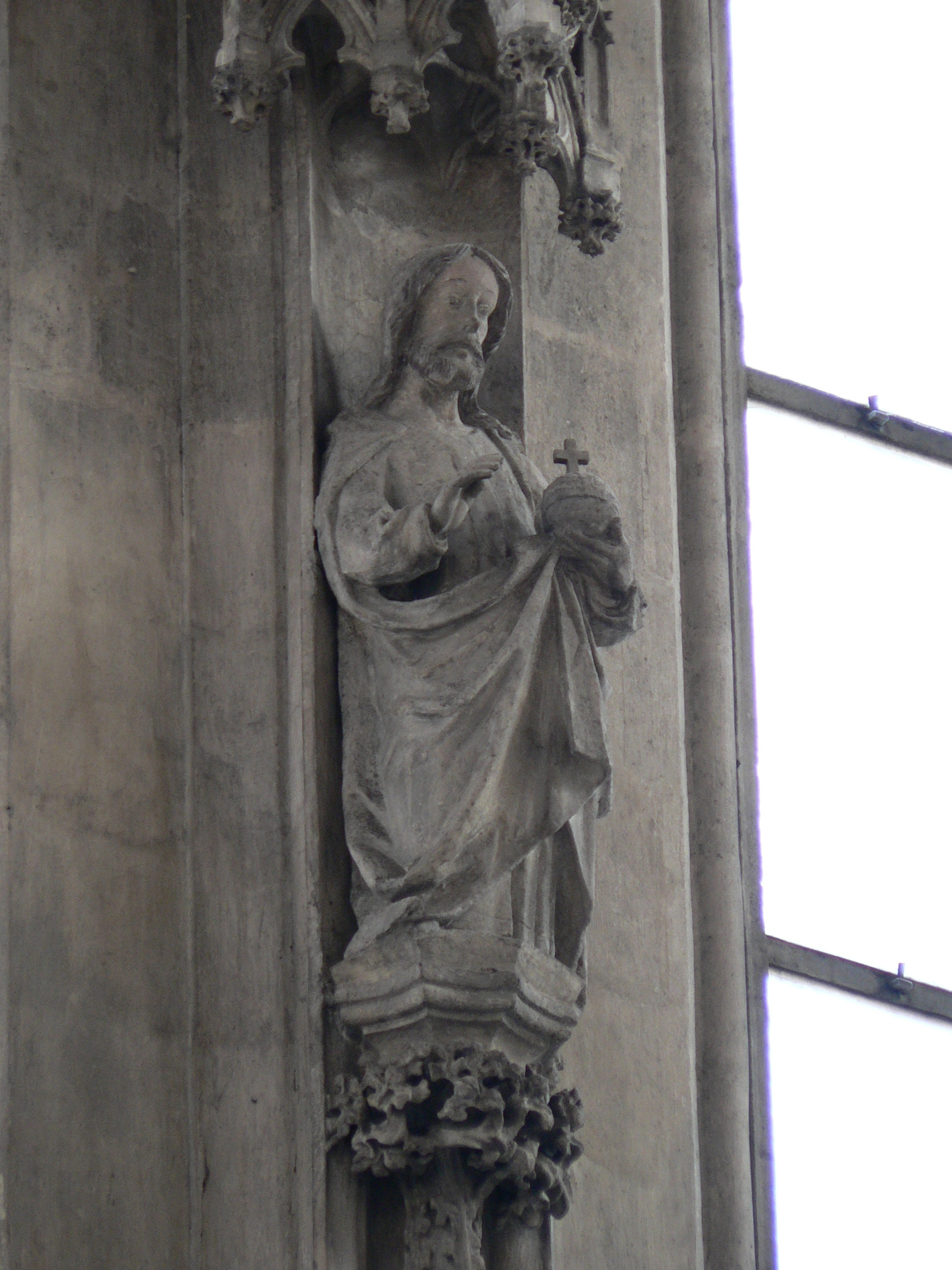
St. Salvator, 1447

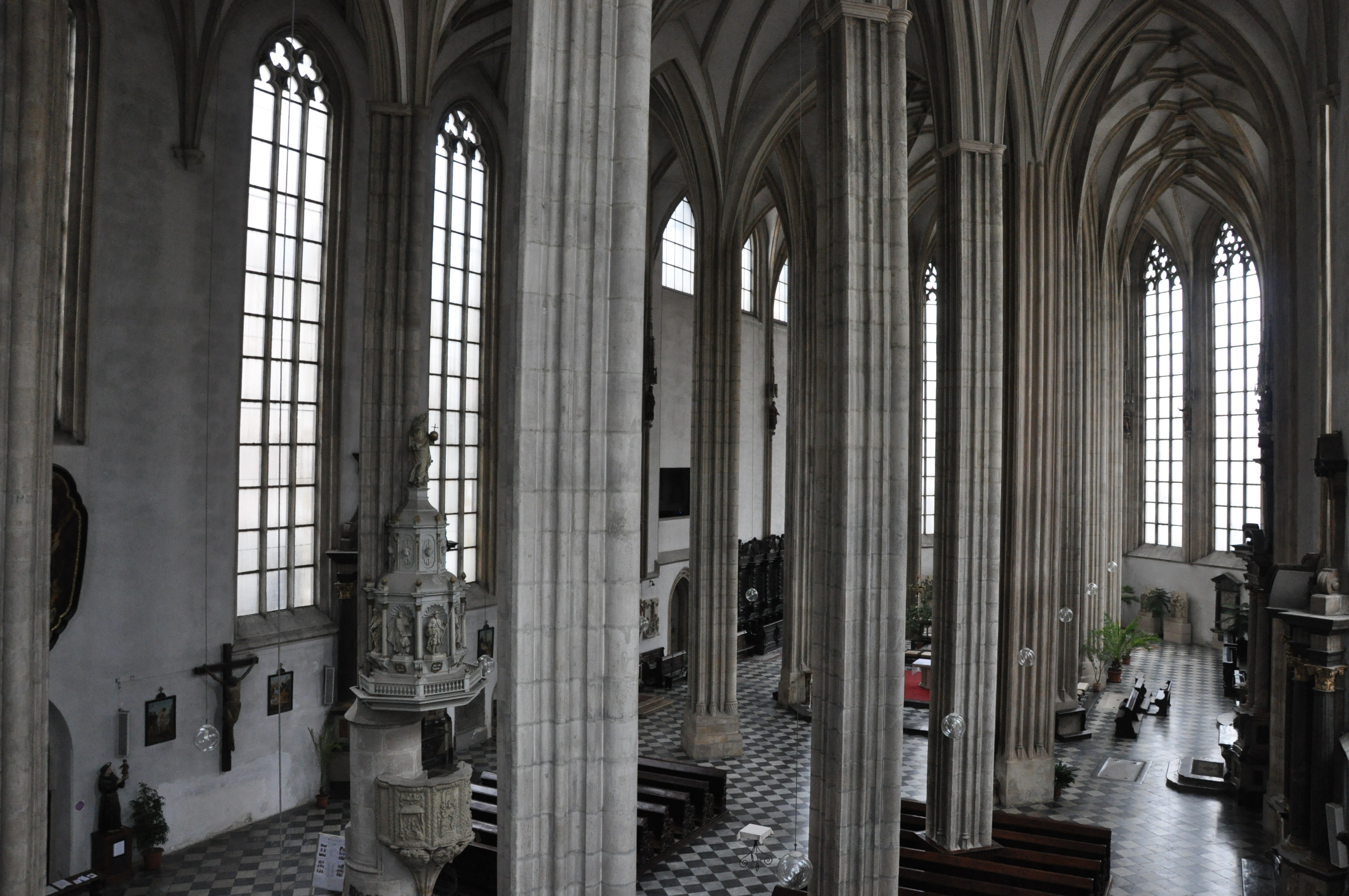
All naves united in the hall church

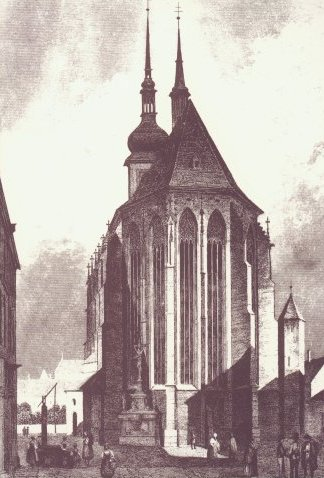
A 19th century depiction from the east side

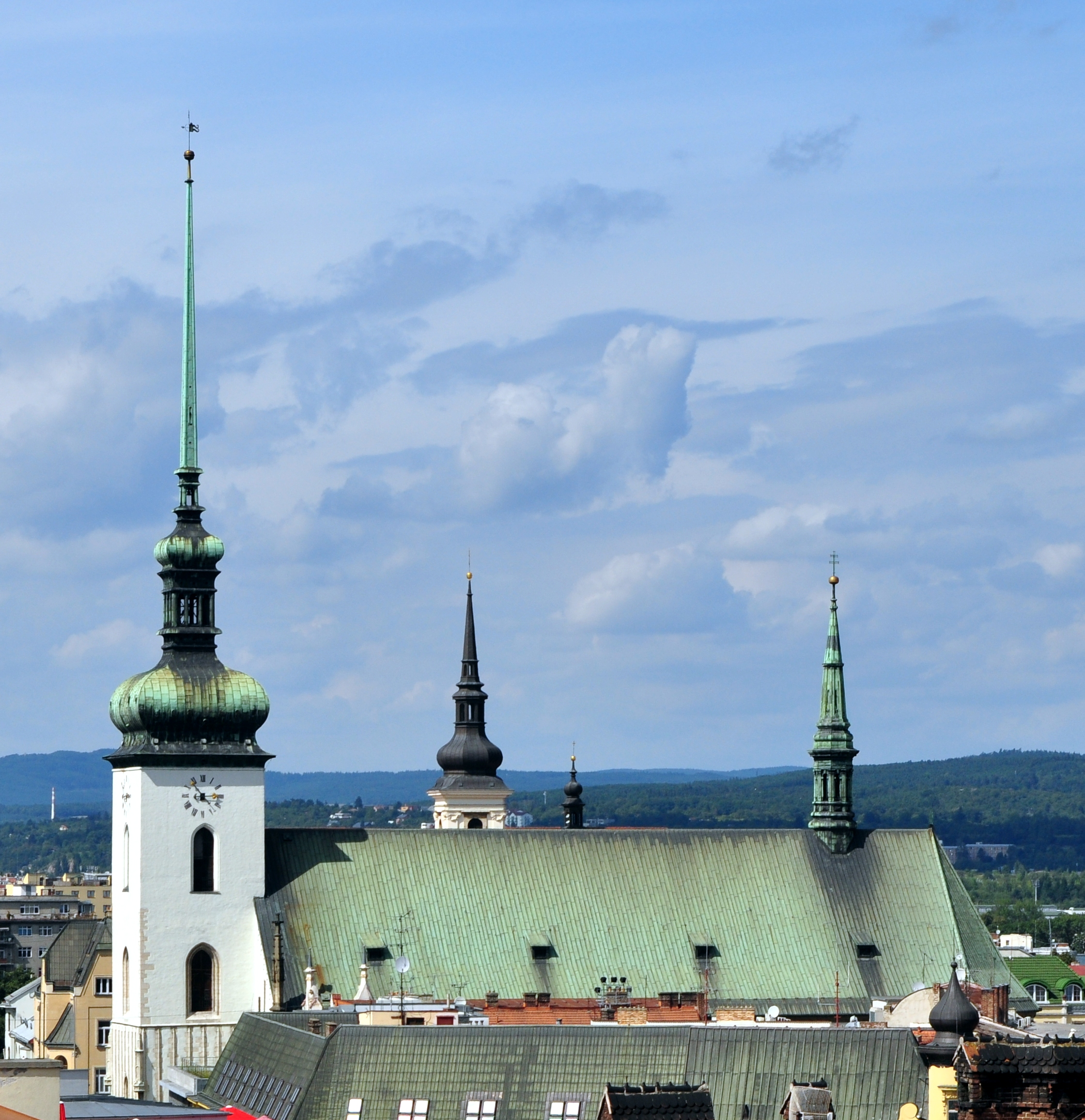
Body of the temple over the roof

== Catacombs ==
Below the temple and next to the temple in the underground catacombs is a huge ossuary. Exemplary arrangement was restored, disinfected and architecturally interesting a decade ago. The catacombs contains approximately 50,000 bones and remnants, the largest in Europe after the Paris catacombs).

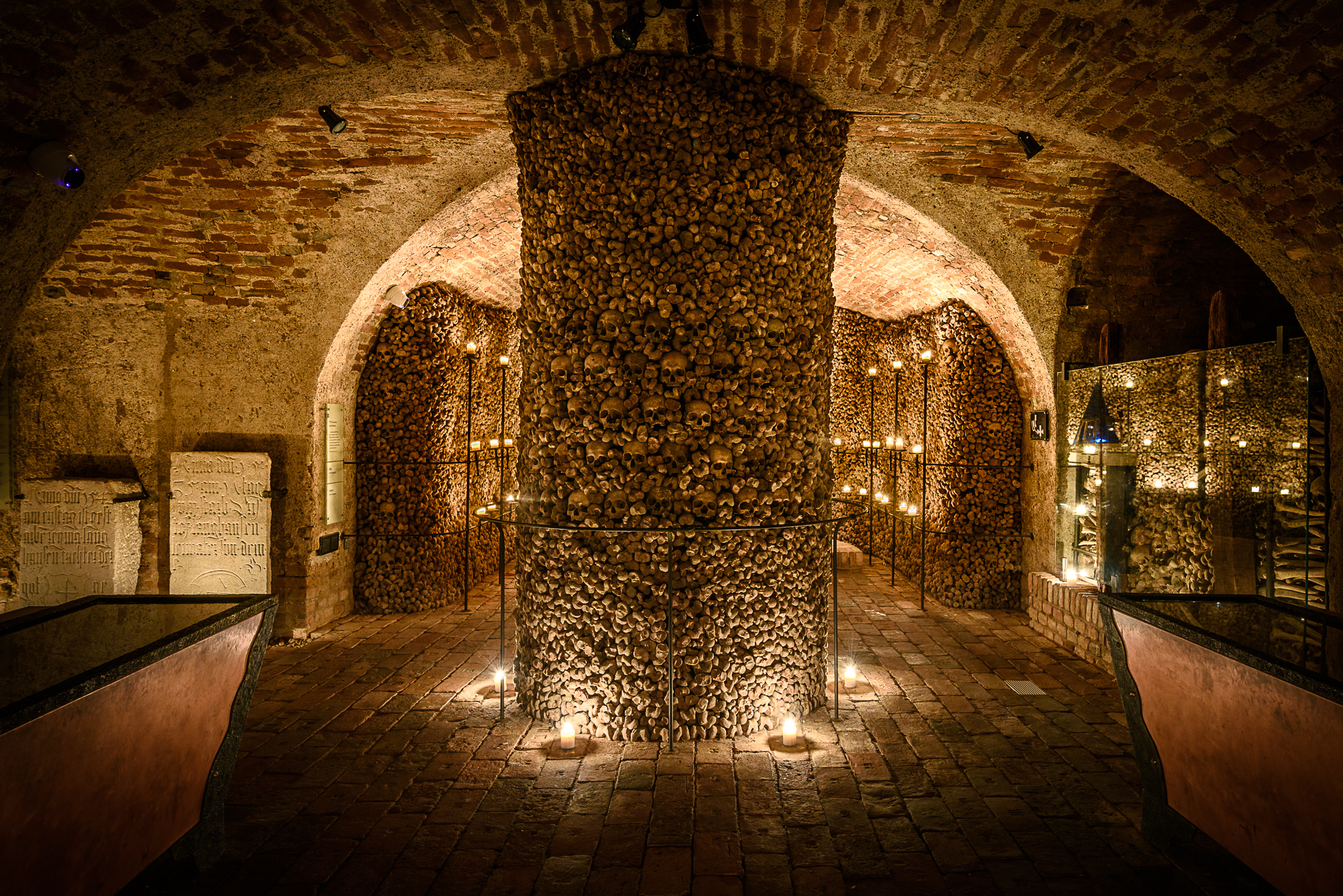
"The High altar", newly erected

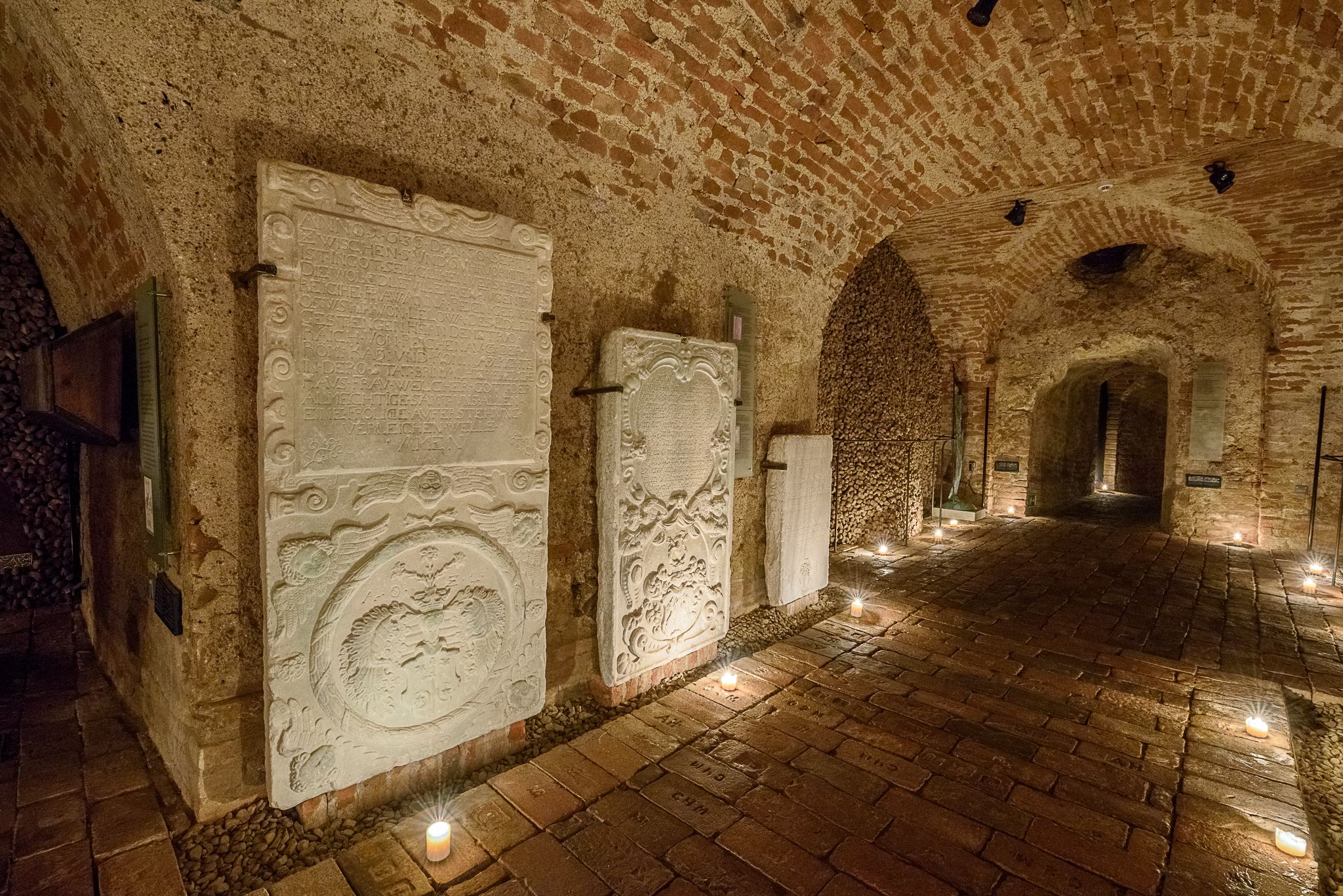
The catacombs ossuary

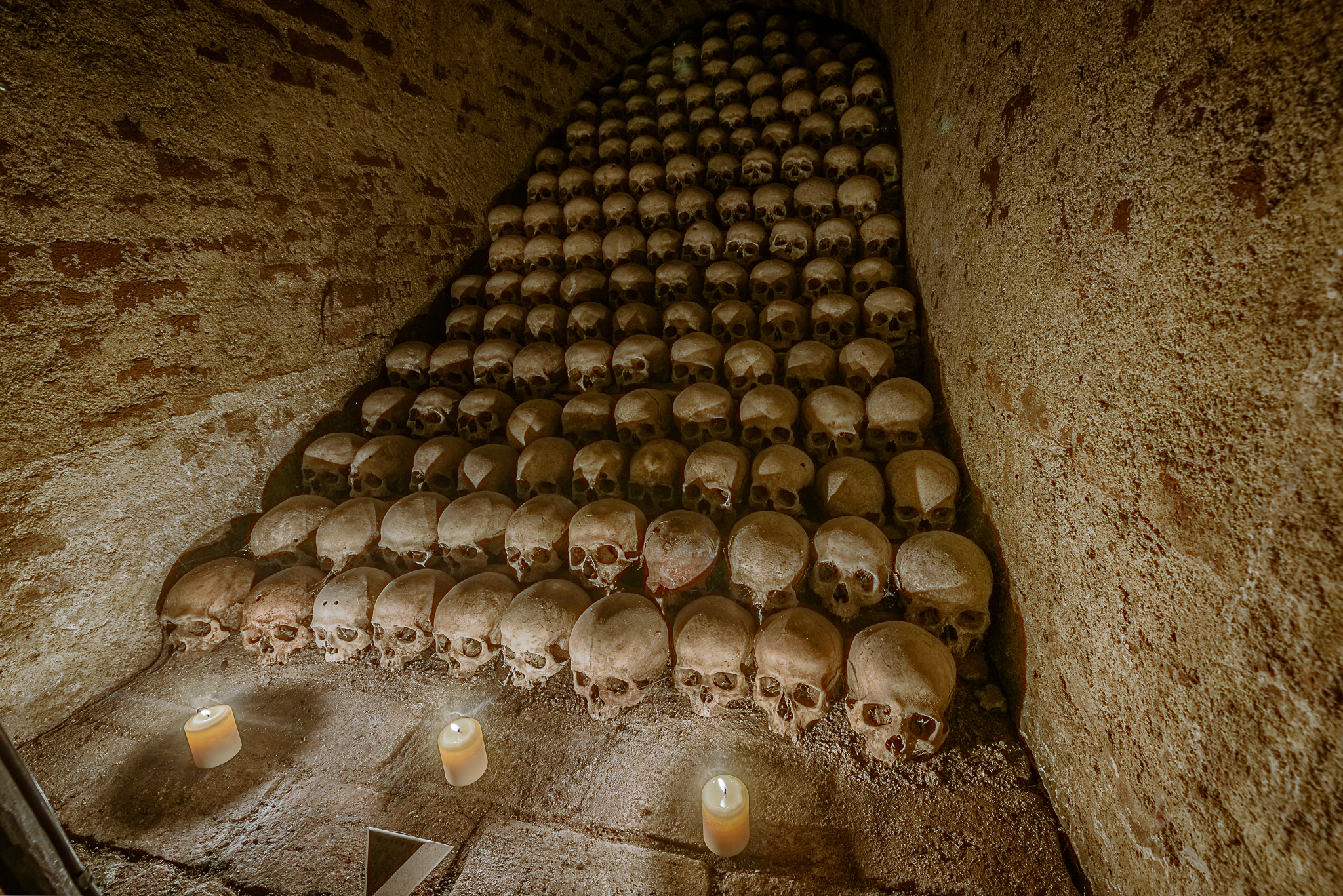
The pyramid constructed of the skulls

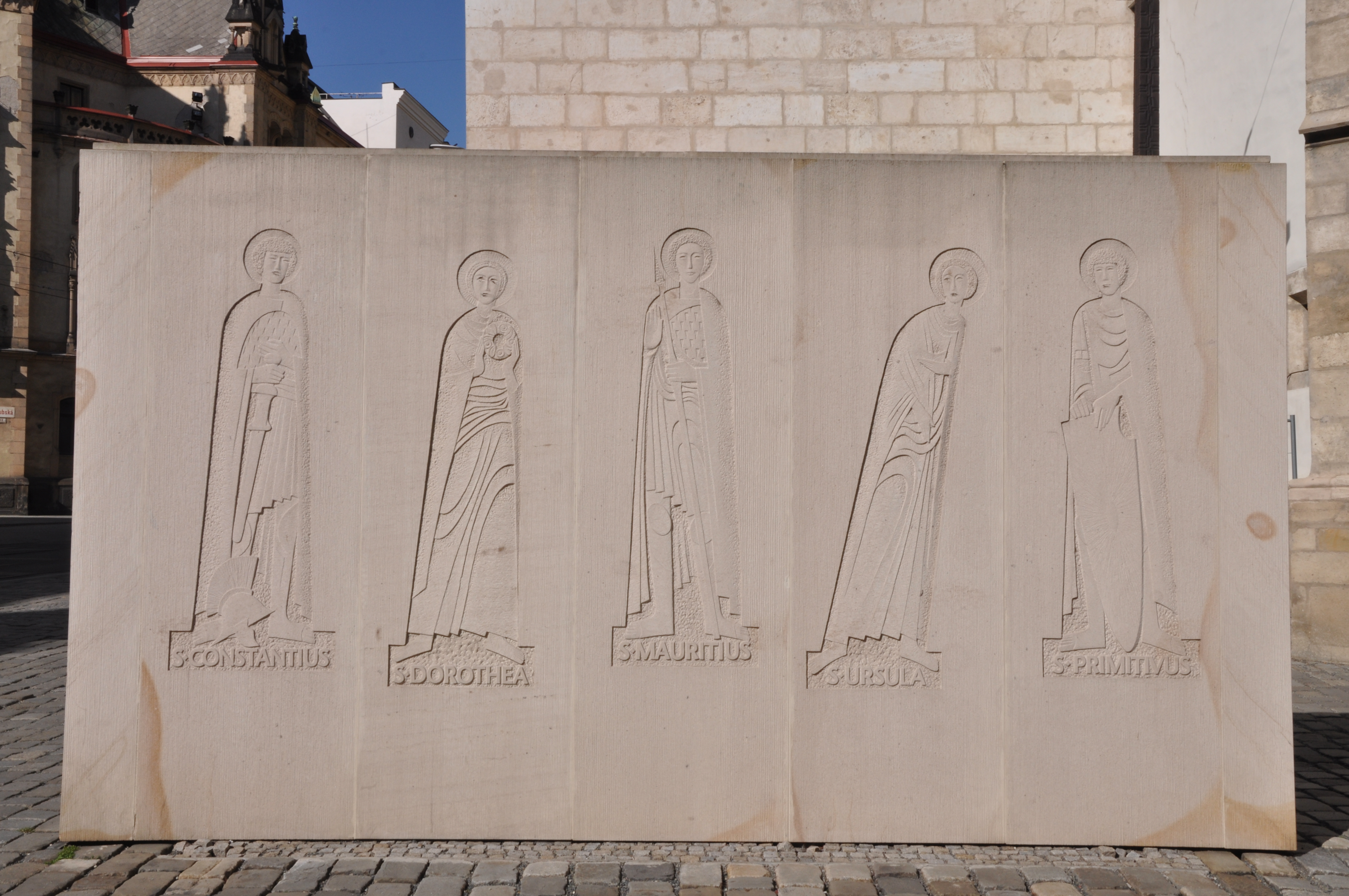
Entrance wall — a stone folding screen

The general plan

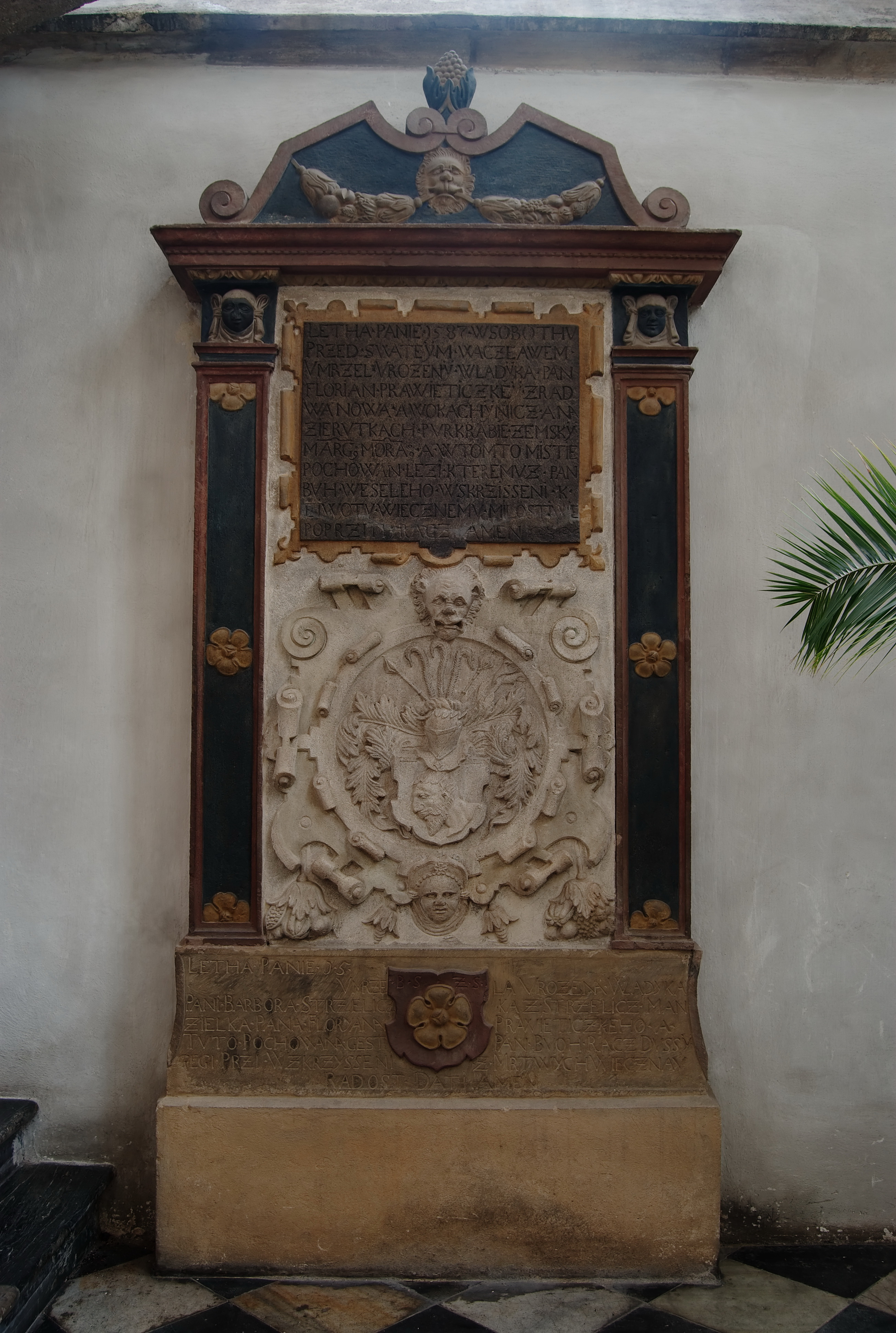
Grave of Florián Pravětic z Radvanova and his wife Božena Střelická ze Střelic

== Legends ==
There is a Brno legend connected with the Church of St. James. The legend is about an indecent man, who is visible in one of the window arches in the south side of the church near the square Náměstí Svobody. The man is showing his naked bottom in the direction of Saint Peter and Paul's cathedral. It all arises from a competition between the two churches to build the higher churchtower. The bottom directed towards Petrov means that Church of St. James won the competition, because its tower is 94 m high, whereas Petrov tower is about 10 m lower, at only 84 m high.

Few know that there is not only one man, but rather two. "It was evidently a stonecutter's joke when he put such statues on the ecclesiastical building" says Jindřich Chatrný from the department of Architecture and Urbanism history in the Museum of Brno City.

In 2001, archaeological exploration revealed the size of Brno Ossuary, an ossuary underneath the square by the church called Jakubské náměstí, which is estimated to contain the remains of 50,000 people.

== Literature ==
- Bretholz, Bertold. Die Pfarrkirche St. Jakob in Brünn Brno: R. M. Rohrer, 1901
- Hálová-Jahodová, Cecilie. Brno, stavební a umělecký vývoj města First ed. Praha: Pražské nakladatelství V. Poláčka, 1947
- Chamonikola, Kaliopi; Martyčáková, Alena. Od gotiky k renesanci: výtvarná kultura Moravy a Slezska 1400-1550 [katalog výstavy] 2. First ed. Brno: Moravská galerie, 1999.
- Libor, Jan. Dějiny Brna 2, Středověké město First ed. Brno: Statutární město Brno, 2013.
- Kučca, Karel. Brno: vývoj města, předměstí a připojených vesnic First ed. Praha: Baset, 2000
- Samek, Bohumil. Umělecké památky Moravy a Slezska 1. A-I. Praha: Academia, 1994
- Šefců, Ondřej. Architektura: lexikon architektonických prvků a stavebního řemesla First ed. Praha: Grada, 2013.
