= Brno Ossuary =

Burial site in Czech Republic

- Brněnská kostnice
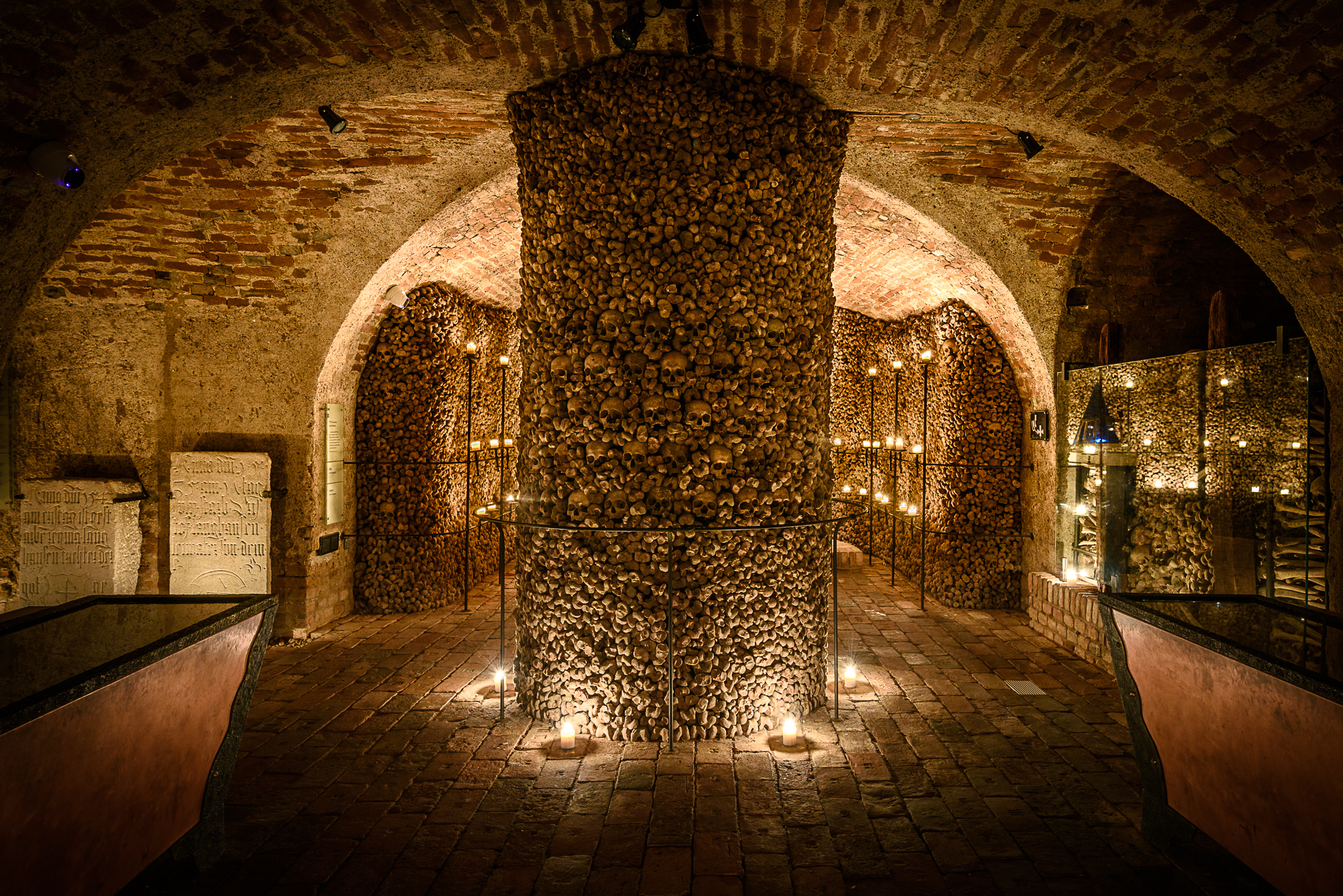
- Established: 2012
- Location: Jakubské náměstí, Brno, Czech Republic, 658 78
- Coordinates: 49°11′48.0″N 16°36′30.4″E
- Type: Ossuary
- Website: podzemibrno.cz/en/mista/kostnice-u-sv-jakuba/

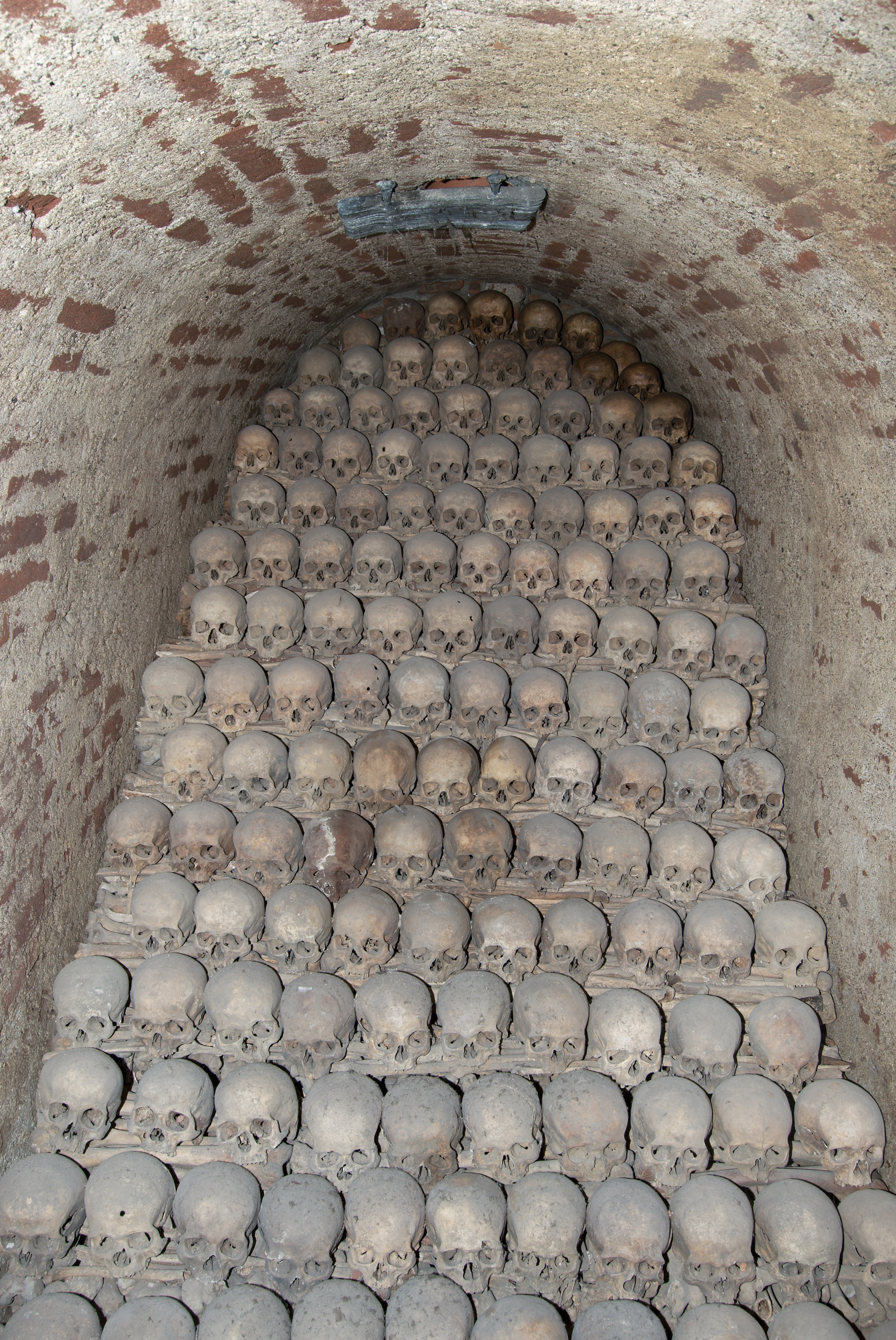
The ossuary

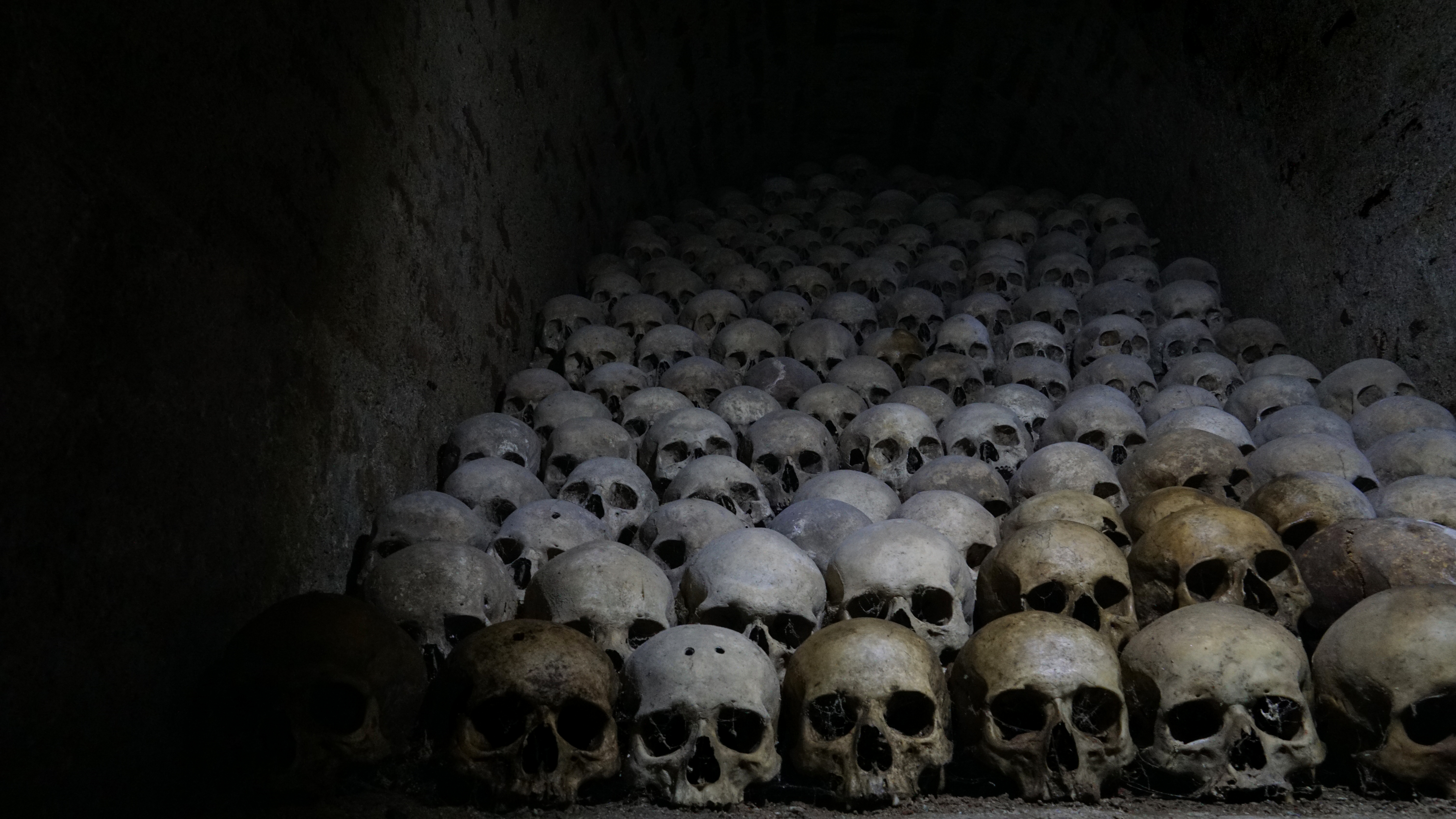
Skulls in Brno Ossuary

Brno Ossuary (Czech: Brněnská kostnice) is an underground ossuary in Brno, Czech Republic. It was rediscovered in 2001 in the historical centre of the city, partially under the Church of St. James. It is estimated that the ossuary holds the remains of over 50 thousand people, which makes it the second-largest ossuary in Europe, after the Catacombs of Paris. The ossuary was founded in the 17th century, and was expanded in the 18th century. It has been open to public since June 2012.
