= Regensburg Congress of 1459 =

Architecture conference

The Regensburg Congress was a meeting of master masons (architects) of Gothic architecture in Regensburg, Bavaria in 1459. At this meeting, and the others that followed, the masters of the Holy Roman Empire specified the regulations of their trade. Such regulations included the secrecy of their methods of design.

The nineteen masters in attendance included those in charge of cathedrals in Regensburg, Vienna (Lorenz Spenning), Basel, Bern, Passau, Salzburg, Konstanz, Weissenau, Landshut, Ingolstadt, Weißenberg, Esslingen, Amberg, Hassfurt, Ochsenfurt and Cologne. The master of Strasbourg Cathedral, Jost Dotzinger, was put in control of all others.
