= Anton Pilgram =

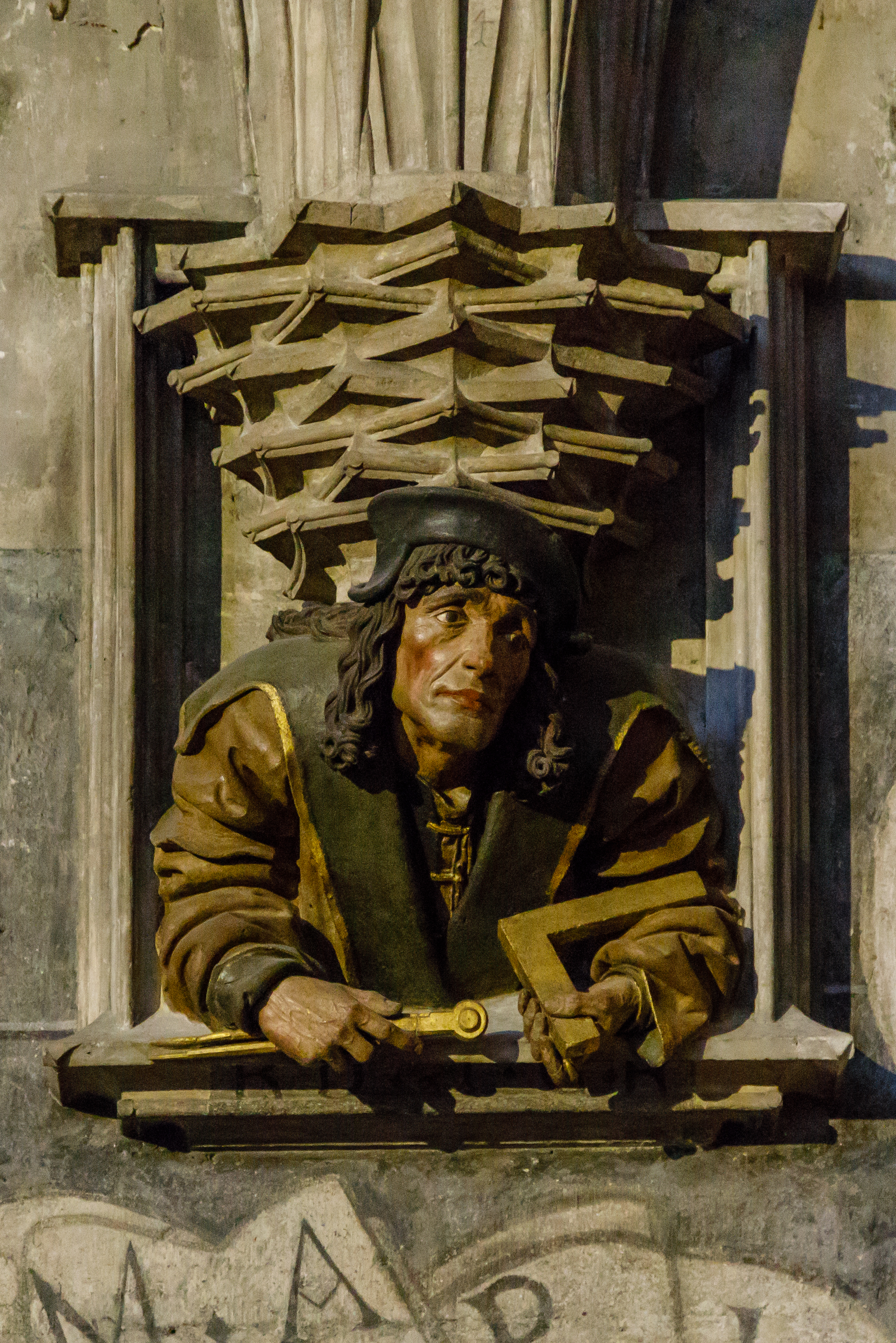
- Anton Pilgram – possible self-portrait. Relief in St. Stephen's Cathedral, Vienna.
- Born: 1460; Brno (?)
- Died: 1516 (aged 55–56); Vienna (?)
- Occupation: Architect
- Buildings: St. Stephen's Cathedral, Vienna; St Jacob Church, Brno; Old City Hall, Brno

Anton Pilgram (also Anton Pilchramb) (around 1460, Brno (?) – 1516, Vienna) was a late medieval Moravian and subsequently Austrian architect and sculptor active in the area of today's Czech Republic (Moravia), Austria and western (Germany) Swabia. Pilgram is known as the sculptor of the portal of Old City Hall and St. James church in Brno and craftsman of the pulpit in St. Stephen's Cathedral, Vienna. He spent a major part of his life in Brno, Moravia.

== Biography ==
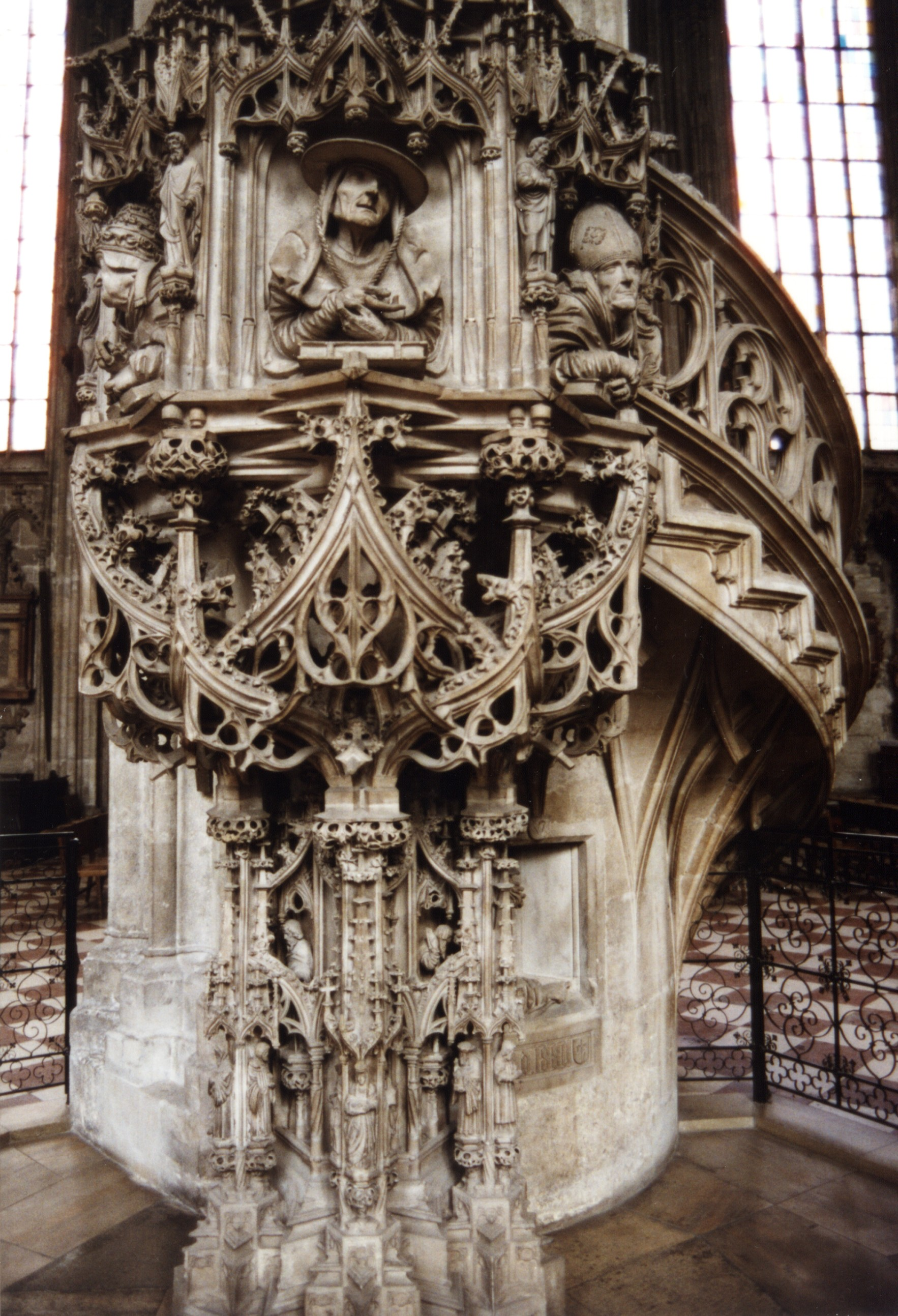
Pulpit in St. Stephen's Cathedral, Vienna

He was born in Brno and later on probably trained stonemason in Vienna, and following that, in 1481, he was invited to Heilbronn. His earliest work was a chancel at the St Kilian Church in Heilbronn. However, research by Kaliopi Chamonikola, 2004, disputes the attribution of the design of the chancel to Pilgram. He created his early architectural works mainly in Swabia, Germany. He participated in the building of the St. George Church in Schwieberdingen and St Lawrence Chapel in Rottweil. During his stay in Swabia, he became familiar with the works of Italian and German Renaissance artists.

He came back to Brno around 1495, and he worked there as a sculptor and stonemason at the St Jacob Church and Judentor (Jews' Gate, 1508). Among his most important works are wooden sculptures of Saint Peter Martyr and a Dominican saint, created around 1511, and particularly the portal of the Old City Hall (1512).

In 1512 Pilgram became a cathedral builder of the St Stephen's Cathedral in Vienna. There he concentrated mainly on smaller architectonic forms, such as the cathedral pulpit (built from 1514 to 1515) and various relief sculptures. Pilgram probably died in Vienna around 1516.

== Style ==
Anton Pilgram is considered to be one of the most talented descendants of Nikolaus Gerhaert of Leiden in Middle Europe. His figural sculptures express a high level of individuality, and are not entirely within medieval artistic expression. Czech art historian Albert Kutal indicated also possible influence of north Italian Renaissance sculpture and paintings by Andrea Mantegna. According to preserved historical documents, Pilgram was a self-confident and contentious artist, who often asserted his artistic individuality against the will of guilds and other institutions.
