= Lorenz Spenning =

Gothic architect

Lorenz Spenning was a Gothic architect who was master of St Stephen's Cathedral, Vienna from 1454. He was present at the Regensburg Congress of 1459.

Reference: http://mek.niif.hu/01900/01919/html/index527.html
