= Norbert Nussbaum =

German architectural historian

Norbert Nussbaum is an architectural historian specialising in the Gothic who is a professor at the Kunsthistorisches Institut, University of Cologne.

== Selected publications ==
=== English ===
- German Gothic church architecture. Yale University Press, New Haven, 2000. ISBN 978-0300083217

=== German ===
- Deutsche kirchenbaukunst der Gotik. Wissenschaftliche Buchgesellschaft, 1994. ISBN 978-3534125425
- Das gotische Gewolbe: Eine Geschichte seiner form und konstruktion. Deutscher Kunstverlag, 1999. ISBN 978-3422062788
