= Emil Marschalk von Ostheim =

German historian

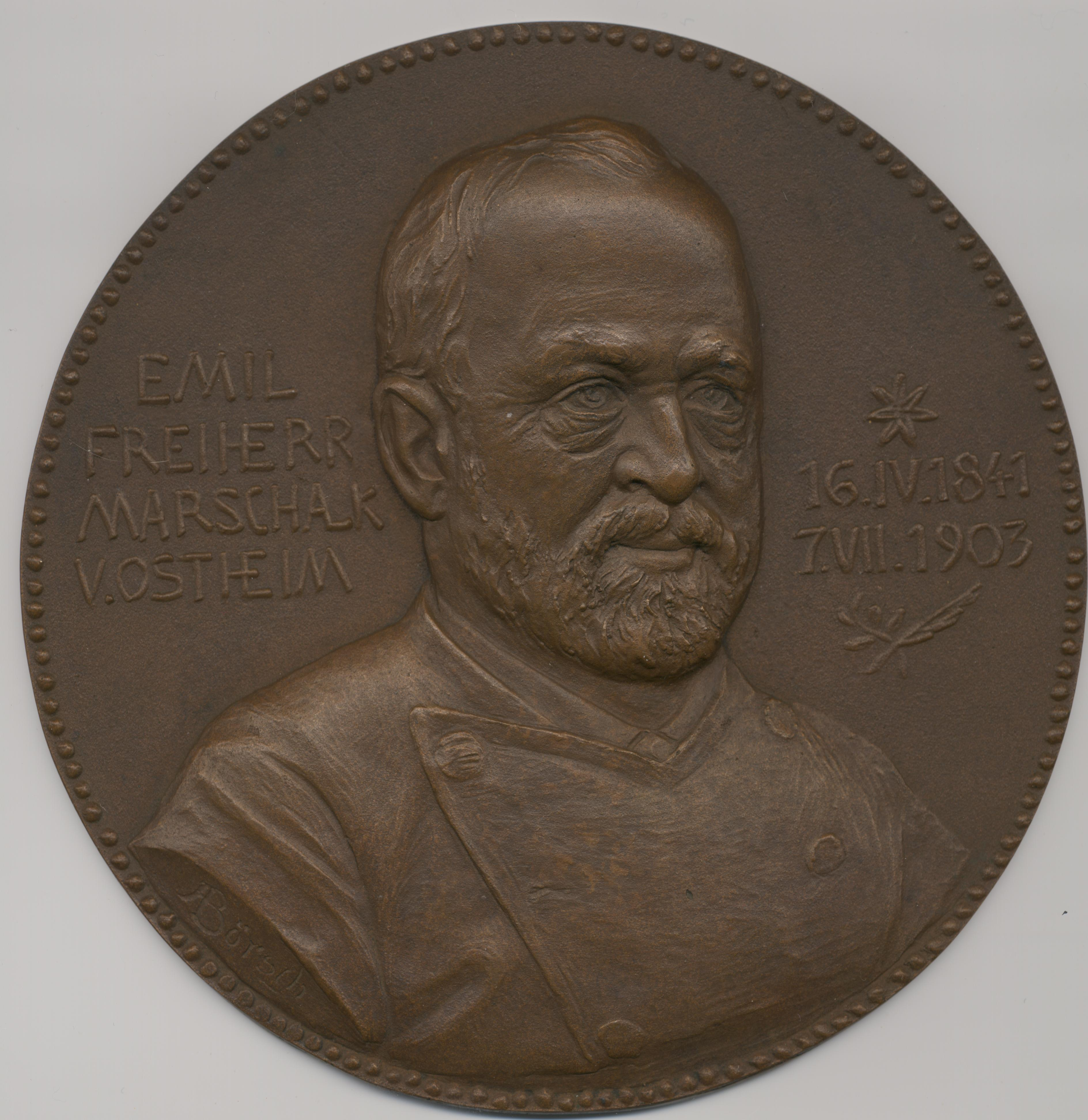
Emil Marschalk von Ostheim.

Emil Freiherr Marschalk von Ostheim (16 April 1841, Bamberg - 7 July 1903, Bamberg) was a German historian, numismatist and collector. His book collection can be found at Bamberg State Library.

== Publications ==
- (in German) Die Bamberger Hofmusik unter den drei letzten Fürstbischöfen. Festschrift zum 50jährigen Jubiläum des Liederkranzes Bamberg, Hübscher Verlag, Bamberg 1885

== Bibliography ==
- "Emil Freiherr Marschalk von Ostheim". Neue Deutsche Biographie (in German). Vol. 9. Berlin: Duncker & Humblot. 1972. p. 640. (in German)
- Wilhelm Schleicher: Die Sammlung Marschalk von Ostheim in der Staatsbibliothek Bamberg. In: "Frankenland“, Vol 20, Pages 115-118, 1968 (in German)
- Rudolf M. Kloos: Nachlaß Marschalk von Ostheim Urkunden, in: "Bayerische Archivinventare“, Vol 38, Munich 1974 (in German)
