= Bamberg =

Town in Upper Franconia, Bavaria, Germany

Bamberg Bambärch (Mainfränkisch)
- Town
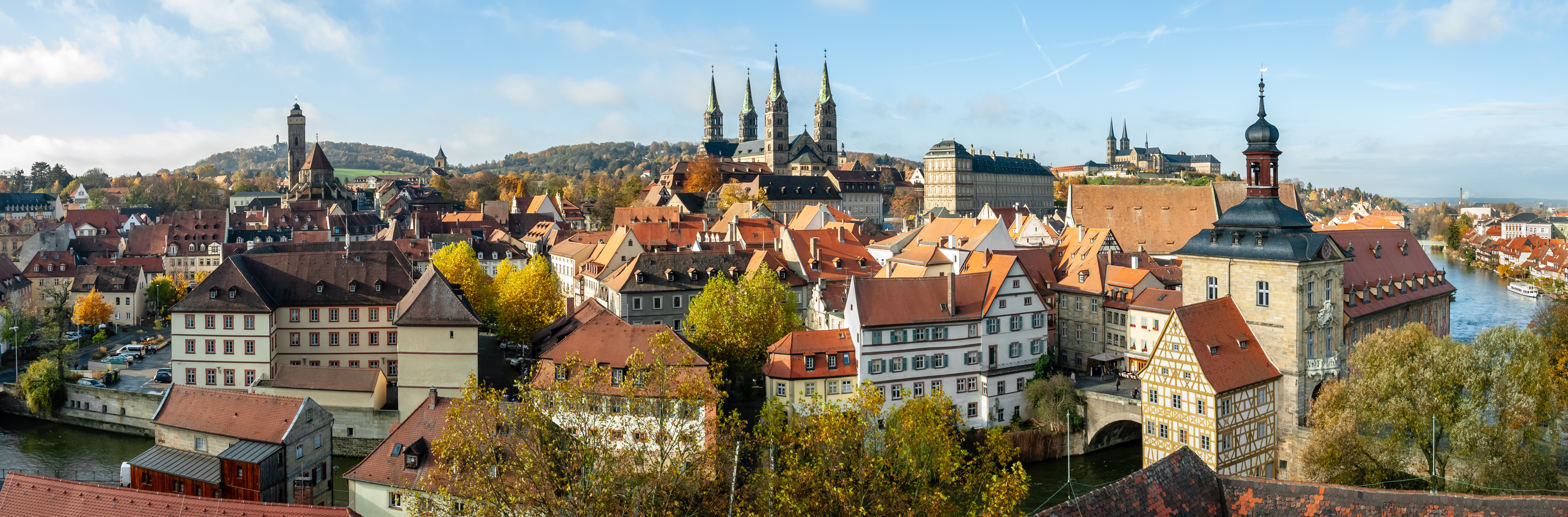
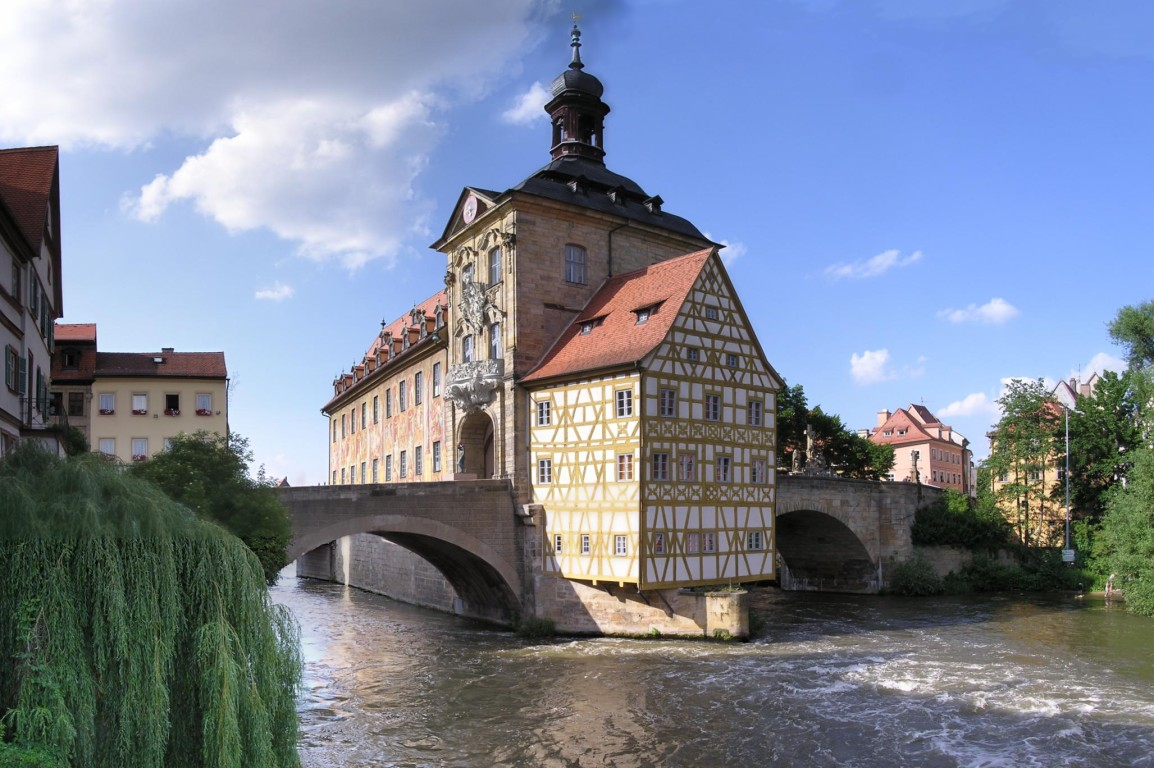
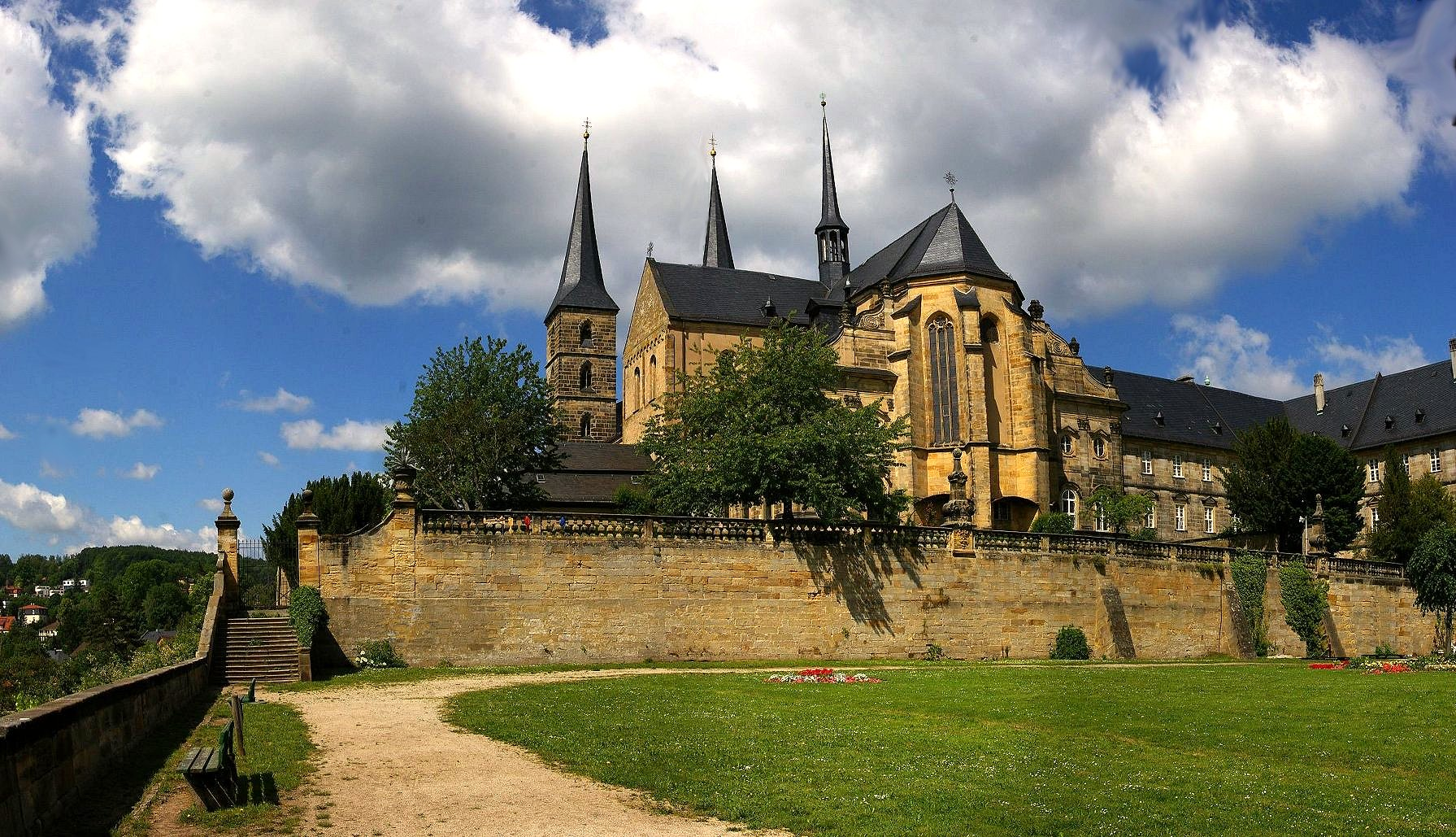
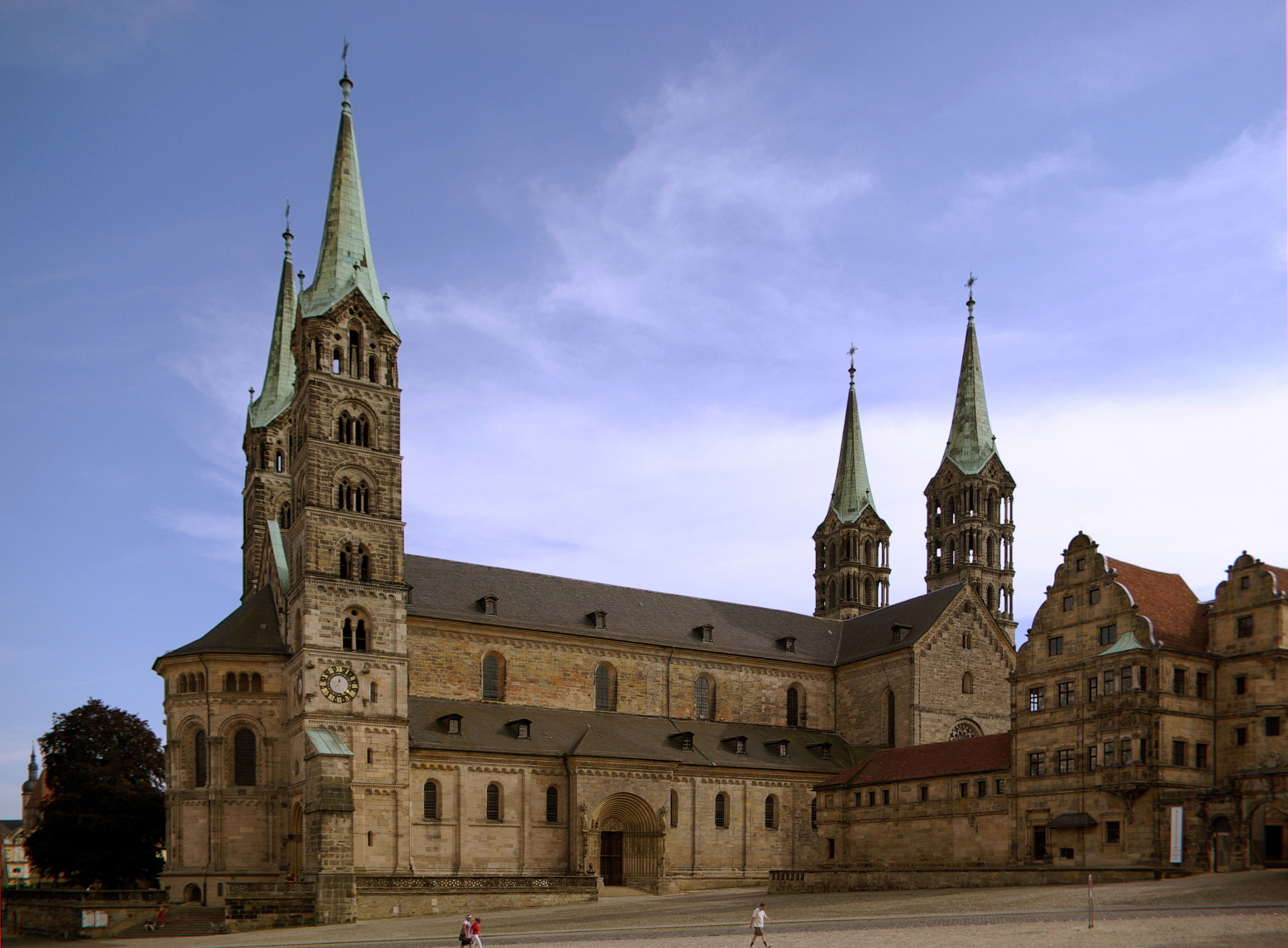
- Skyline, old town hall (Altes Rathaus), Michaelsberg Abbey, Bamberg Cathedral.

- Flag Coat of arms
- Interactive map of Bamberg
- Location within Germany Location within Bavaria
- Coordinates: 49°53′29″N 10°53′13″E
- Country: Germany
- State: Bavaria
- Admin. region: Upper Franconia
- District: Urban district

Government
  - Mayor (2020–26): Andreas Starke (SPD)

Area
  - Total: 54.62 km^{2} (21.09 sq mi)
- Elevation: 262 m (860 ft)

Population (2025-12-31)
  - Total: 77,218
  - Density: 1,414/km^{2} (3,662/sq mi)
- Time zone: UTC+01:00 (CET)
  - Summer (DST): UTC+02:00 (CEST)
- Postal codes: 96047, 96049, 96050, 96051, 96052
- Dialling codes: 0951
- Vehicle registration: BA
- Website: www.stadt.bamberg.de

UNESCO World Heritage Site
- Official name: Town of Bamberg
- Criteria: Cultural: ii, iv
- Reference: 624
- Inscription: 1993 (17th Session)
- Area: 142 ha (350 acres)
- Buffer zone: 444 ha (1,100 acres)

Bamberg (/ˈbæmbɜːrɡ/, US also /ˈbɑːmbɛərk/, German: [ˈbambɛʁk]; East Franconian: Bambärch) is a town in Upper Franconia, Bavaria, Germany, on the river Regnitz close to its confluence with the river Main. Bamberg had 79,000 inhabitants in 2022. The town dates back to the 9th century, when its name was derived from the nearby Babenberch castle. Cited as one of Germany's most beautiful towns, with medieval streets and buildings, the old town of Bamberg with around 2,400 timber houses has been a UNESCO World Heritage Site since 1993.

From the 10th century onwards, Bamberg became a key link with the Western Slavic peoples, notably those of Poland and Pomerania. It experienced a period of great prosperity from the 12th century onwards, during which time it was briefly the centre of the Holy Roman Empire. Emperor Henry II was buried in the old town, alongside his wife Kunigunde. The town's architecture from this period strongly influenced that in Northern Germany and Hungary. From the middle of the 13th century onwards, the bishops were princes of the Empire and ruled Bamberg, overseeing the construction of monumental buildings. This growth was complemented by the obtaining of large portions of the estates of the Counts of Meran in 1248 and 1260 by the sea, partly through purchase and partly through the appropriation of extinguished fiefs.

Bamberg lost its independence in 1802, following the secularization of church lands, becoming part of Bavaria in 1803. The town was first connected to the German rail system in 1844, which has been an important part of its infrastructure ever since. After a communist uprising took control over Bavaria in the years following World War I, the state government fled to Bamberg and stayed there for almost two years before the Bavarian capital of Munich was retaken by Freikorps units (see Bavarian Soviet Republic). The first republican constitution of Bavaria was passed in Bamberg, becoming known as the Bamberger Verfassung (Bamberg Constitution).

Following the Second World War, Bamberg was an important base for the Bavarian, German, and then American military stationed at Warner Barracks, until closing in 2014.

== History ==
Historical affiliations

Prince-Bishopric of Bamberg 1245–1802
Electorate of Bavaria 1802–1805
Kingdom of Bavaria 1805–1918
German Empire 1871–1918
Weimar Republic 1918–1933
Nazi Germany 1933–1945
Allied-occupied Germany 1945–1949
West Germany 1949–1990
Germany 1990–present

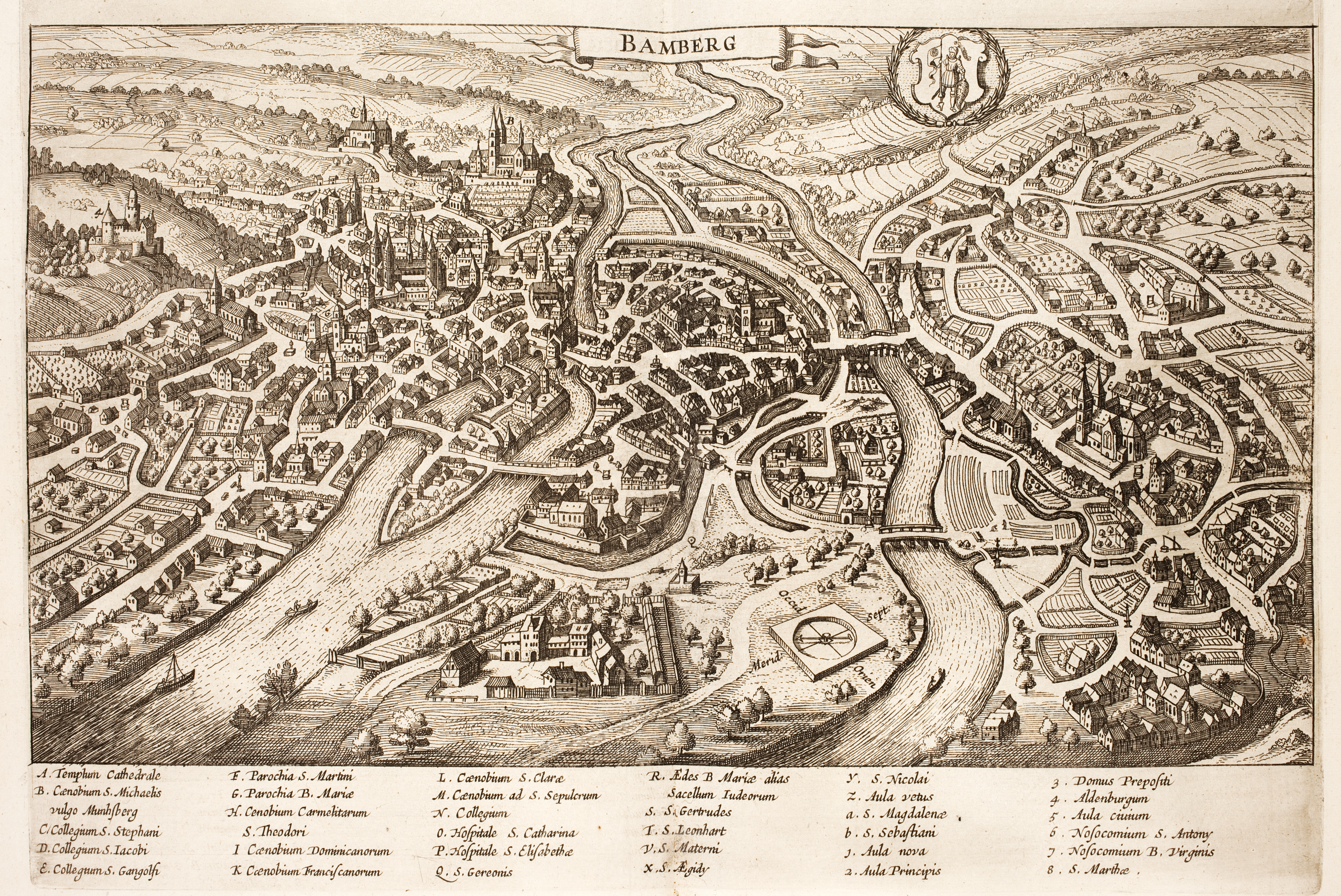
17th century 3D-map of Bamberg. Matthias Merian in Danckerts, Historis, 1632

During the post-Roman centuries of Germanic migration and settlement, the region later included in the Diocese of Bamberg was inhabited for the most part by Slavs. The town, first mentioned in 902, grew up by the castle Babenberch which gave its name to the Babenberg family. On their extinction, it passed to the Saxon house. The area was Christianized chiefly by the monks of the Benedictine Fulda Abbey, and the land was under the spiritual authority of the Diocese of Würzburg. In 1007, Holy Roman Emperor Henry II made Bamberg a family inheritance, the seat of a separate diocese. The Emperor's purpose in this was to make the Diocese of Würzburg less unwieldy in size and to give Christianity a firmer footing in the districts of Franconia, east of Bamberg.

In 1008, after long negotiations with the Bishops of Würzburg and Eichstätt, who were to cede portions of their dioceses, the boundaries of the new diocese were defined, and Pope John XVIII granted the papal confirmation in the same year. Henry II ordered the building of a new cathedral, which was consecrated on 6 May 1012. The church was enriched with gifts from the pope, and Henry had it dedicated in honor of him. In 1017, Henry founded Michaelsberg Abbey on the Michaelsberg ("Mount St Michael"), near Bamberg, a Benedictine abbey for the training of the clergy. The emperor and his wife, Kunigunde, gave large temporal possessions to the new diocese, and it received many privileges out of which grew the secular power of the bishop. Pope Benedict VIII visited Bamberg in 1020 to meet Henry II for discussions concerning the Holy Roman Empire. While he was there, he placed the diocese in direct dependence on the Holy See. He also personally consecrated some of Bamberg's churches. For a short time, Bamberg was the centre of the Holy Roman Empire. Henry and Kunigunde were both buried in the cathedral.

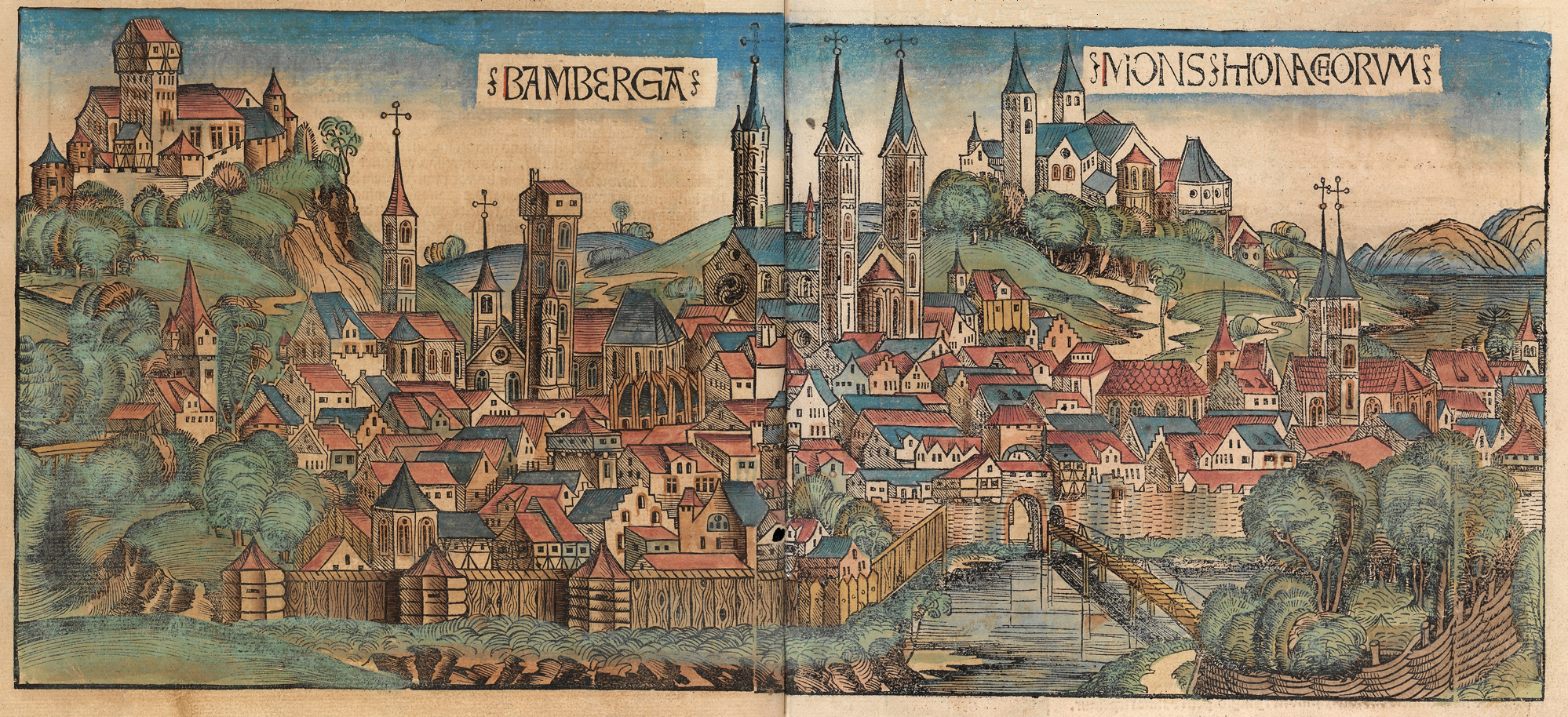
Woodcut of Bamberg from the Nuremberg Chronicle, 1493

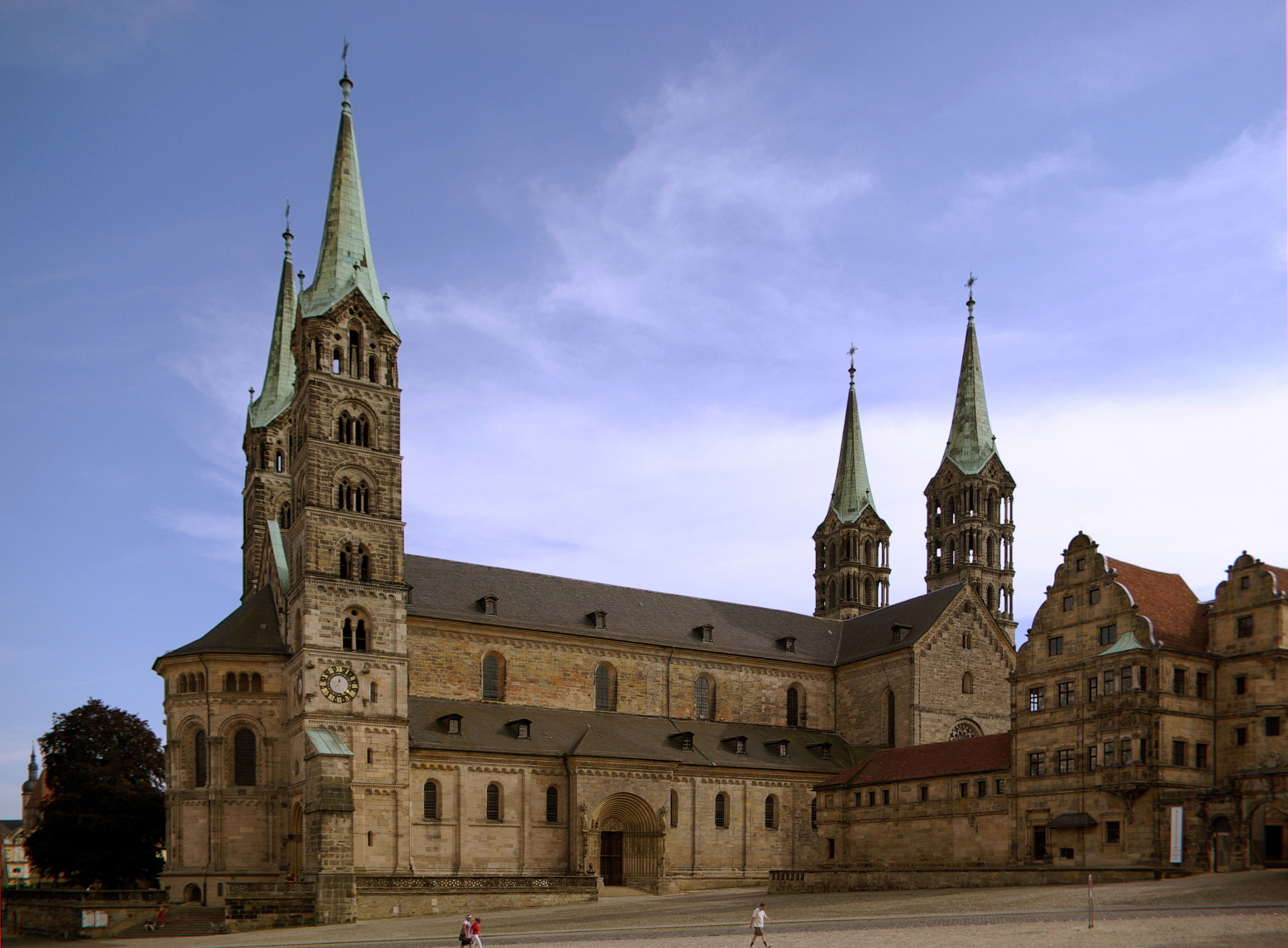
Bamberg Cathedral

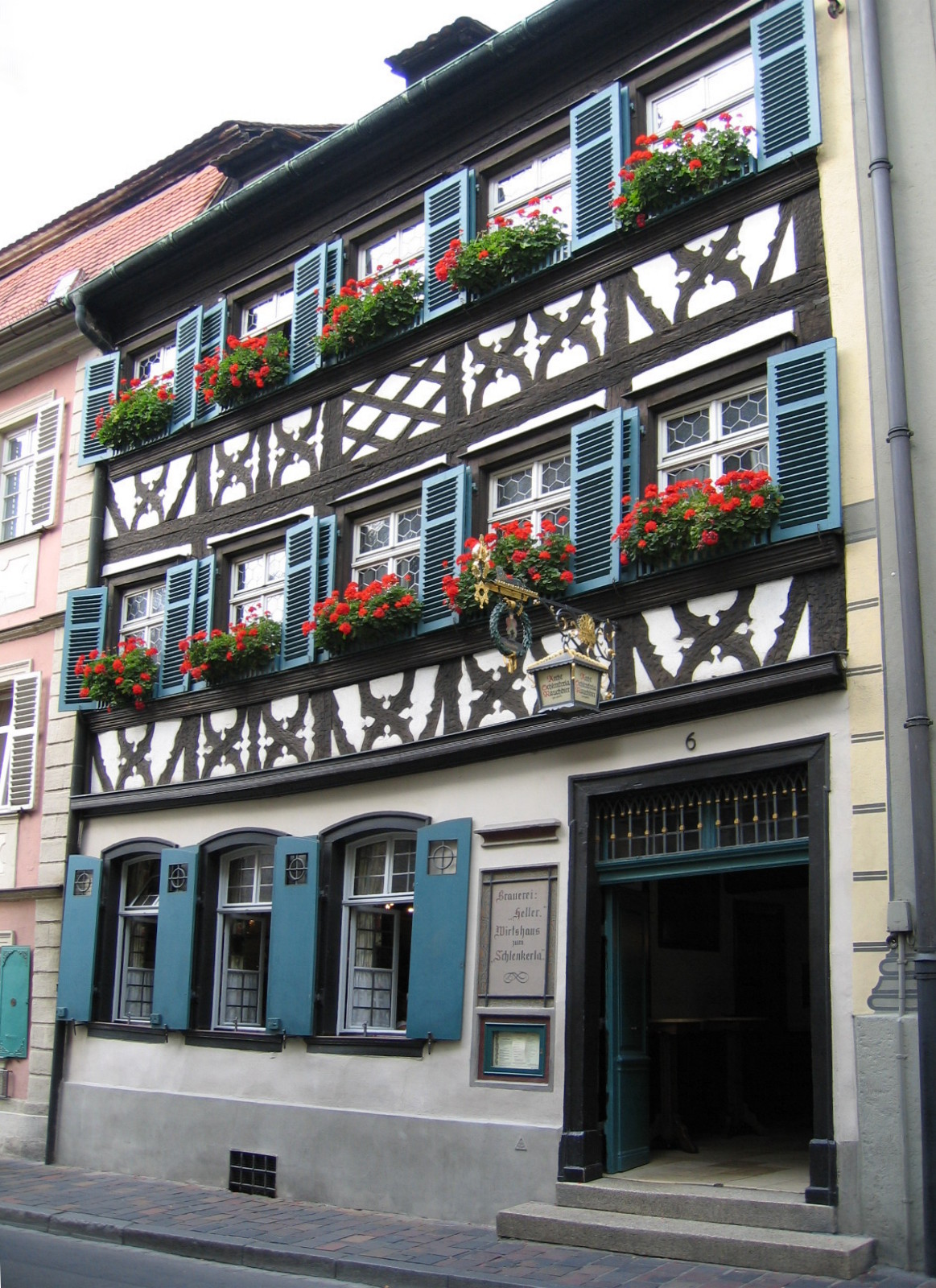
The Schlenkerla, one of Bamberg's breweries and taverns

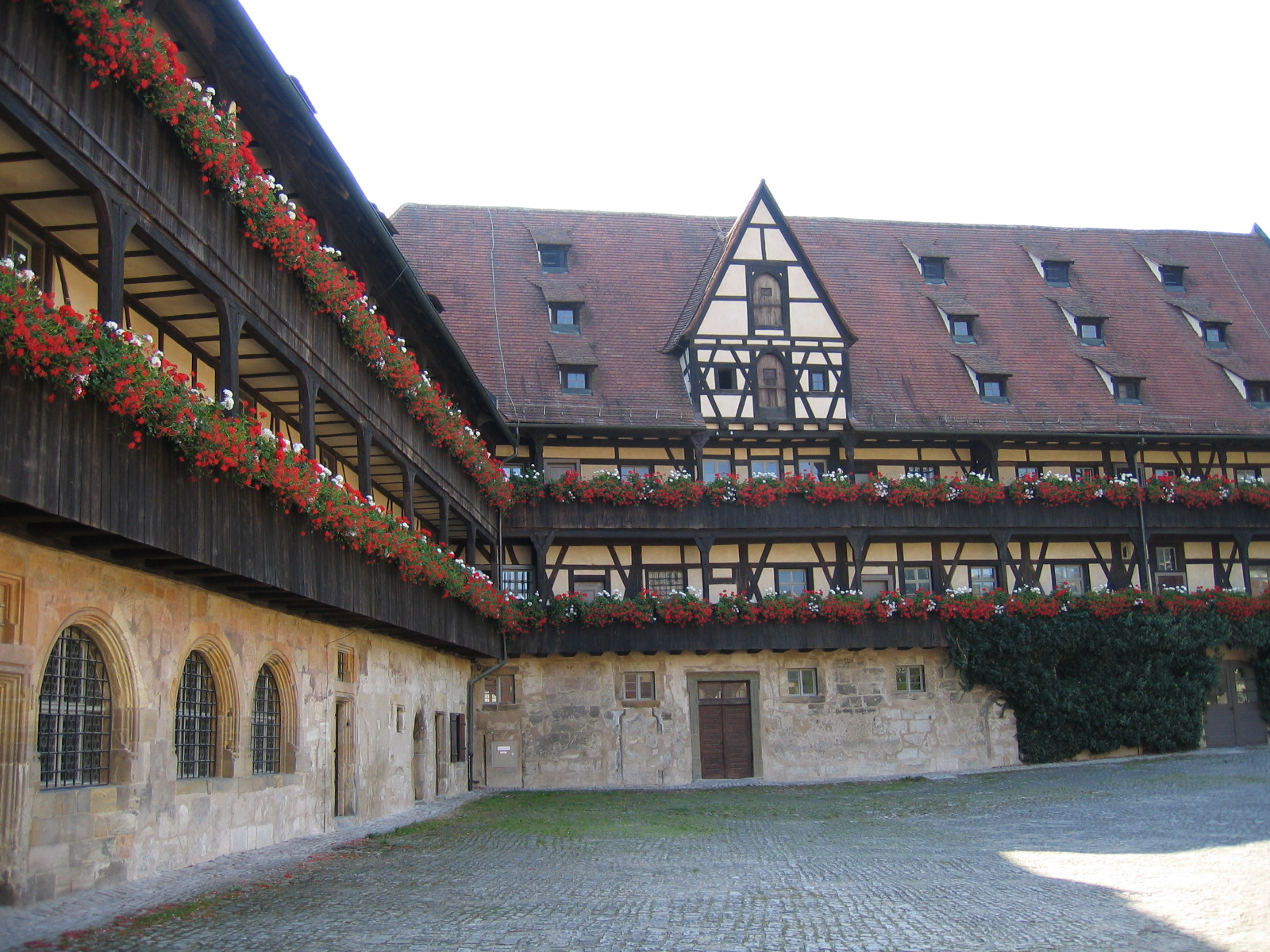
The old palace (Alte Hofhaltung)

From the middle of the 13th century onwards, the bishops were princes of the Empire and ruled Bamberg, overseeing the construction of monumental buildings. In 1248 and 1260, the See obtained large portions of the estates of the Counts of Meran, partly through purchase and partly through the appropriation of extinguished fiefs.

The old Bishopric of Bamberg was composed of an unbroken territory extending from Schlüsselfeld in a northeasterly direction to the Franconian Forest, and possessed in addition estates in the Duchies of Carinthia and Salzburg, in the Nordgau (the present Upper Palatinate), in Thuringia, and on the Danube. By the changes resulting from the Reformation, the territory of this see was reduced by nearly one half in extent. Since 1279 the coat of arms of the city of Bamberg is known in the form of a seal.

The witch trials of the 17th century claimed about one thousand victims in Bamberg, reaching a climax between 1626 and 1631, under the rule of Prince-Bishop Johann Georg II Fuchs von Dornheim. The famous Drudenhaus (witch prison), built in 1627, is no longer standing today; however, detailed accounts of some cases, such as that of Johannes Junius, remain.

In 1647, the University of Bamberg was founded as Academia Bambergensis.

Bambrzy (Posen Bambergers) are German Poles who are descended from settlers from the Bamberg area who settled in villages around Poznań in the years 1719–1753. In 1759, the possessions and jurisdictions of the diocese situated in Austria were sold to that state. When the secularization of church lands took place (1802) the diocese covered 3,305 km^{2} (1,276 sq mi) and had a population of 207,000. Bamberg thus lost its independence in 1802, becoming part of Bavaria in 1803. The free state of Bavaria and the Federal Republic of Germany gave protections to Bamberg, though the city does handle its own management of properties.

In 1815 chief of staff of French Emperor Napoleon Bonaparte, Louis Alexandre Berthier died in Bamberg, after falling out of the window of his Bamberg home.

Bamberg was first connected to the German rail system in 1844, which has been an important part of its infrastructure ever since. After a communist uprising took control over Bavaria in the years following World War I, the state government fled to Bamberg and stayed there for almost two years before the Bavarian capital of Munich was retaken by Freikorps units (see Bavarian Soviet Republic). The first republican constitution of Bavaria was passed in Bamberg, becoming known as the Bamberger Verfassung (Bamberg Constitution).

In February 1926 Bamberg served as the venue for the Bamberg Conference, convened by Adolf Hitler in his attempt to foster unity and to stifle dissent within the then-young Nazi party. Bamberg was chosen for its location in Upper Franconia, reasonably close to the residences of the members of the dissident northern Nazi faction but still within Bavaria.

During the Bombing of Bamberg, the city was hit a total of nine times by Allied warplanes between 1944 and 1945. While Bamberg was not attacked as badly as nearby Nuremberg, 4.4% of the city ended up being destroyed and 378 civilians died. The biggest and deadliest bombing run happened on 22 February 1945. In the afternoon, American planes attacked the Bamberg railway station and surroundings with bombs. Bombs also hit residential houses, killing a total of 216 civilians and causing many houses between Oberer Stephansberg and Oberer Kaulberg to be damaged or destroyed as a result. The inner city was also hit, particularly in the Obstmarkt, Lange Straße, Grüner Markt and Keßlerstraße. Three significant landmarks in the city were hit: the Erlöserkirche or Church of the Redeemer at the Kunigundendamm which was almost completely destroyed (only the tower remained), the historic Altane on the Grüner Markt and the Alte Maut or Old Toll. A follow-up attack was planned for 23 February, but ultimately cancelled due to bad weather. After that, low-flying Allied aircraft continued to attack Bamberg, threatening large gatherings of people and sometimes also dropping leaflets mocking National Socialism and its propaganda. Another 67 people died as a result of these attacks. The city fell with little resistance to American troops on 14 April, despite the use of explosives on all of the bridges to the city by the retreating German forces. After the war ended, reconstruction efforts began.

=== Historical population ===
Year	Population
1818	17,000
1885	31,521
1905	45,308

Largest groups of foreign residents
Nationality	Population (2013)
Turkey	1,076
Italy	359
Greece	232
Portugal	119
Spain	115

== Geography ==
Bamberg is located in Franconia, 63 km (39 mi) north of Nuremberg by railway and 101 km (63 mi) east of Würzburg, also by rail. It is situated on the Regnitz river, 3 km (1.9 mi) before it flows into the Main river.

Its geography is shaped by the Regnitz and by the foothills of the Steigerwald, part of the German uplands. From northeast to southwest, the town is divided into first the Regnitz plain, then one large and several small islands formed by two arms of the Regnitz (Inselstadt), and finally the part of town on the hills, the "Hill Town" (Bergstadt).

=== The seven hills of Bamberg ===
Bamberg extends over seven hills, each crowned by a church. This has led to Bamberg being called the "Franconian Rome"—although a running joke among Bamberg's tour guides is to refer to Rome instead as the "Italian Bamberg". The hills are Cathedral Hill, Michaelsberg, Kaulberg/Obere Pfarre, Stefansberg, Jakobsberg, Altenburger Hill and Abtsberg.

=== Climate ===
Climate in this area has mild differences between highs and lows, and there is adequate rainfall year-round. The Köppen climate classification subtype for this climate is "Cfb" (Marine West Coast Climate/Oceanic climate), with a certain continental influence as indicated by average winter nighttime temperatures well below zero.

Climate data for Bamberg (1991–2020 normals, extremes 1991–present)
Month	Jan	Feb	Mar	Apr	May	Jun	Jul	Aug	Sep	Oct	Nov	Dec	Year
Record high °C (°F)	15.8 (60.4)	19.9 (67.8)	24.4 (75.9)	31.8 (89.2)	33.3 (91.9)	37.8 (100.0)	38.0 (100.4)	38.3 (100.9)	33.3 (91.9)	27.6 (81.7)	21.9 (71.4)	17.7 (63.9)	38.3 (100.9)
Mean maximum °C (°F)	11.1 (52.0)	13.3 (55.9)	19.1 (66.4)	24.9 (76.8)	28.7 (83.7)	32.3 (90.1)	33.3 (91.9)	33.1 (91.6)	27.7 (81.9)	22.4 (72.3)	15.9 (60.6)	11.6 (52.9)	35.0 (95.0)
Mean daily maximum °C (°F)	3.7 (38.7)	5.5 (41.9)	10.3 (50.5)	15.9 (60.6)	20.0 (68.0)	23.4 (74.1)	25.5 (77.9)	25.3 (77.5)	20.2 (68.4)	14.4 (57.9)	7.9 (46.2)	4.3 (39.7)	14.7 (58.5)
Daily mean °C (°F)	0.7 (33.3)	1.3 (34.3)	5.0 (41.0)	9.5 (49.1)	13.9 (57.0)	17.3 (63.1)	19.1 (66.4)	18.5 (65.3)	13.9 (57.0)	9.3 (48.7)	4.6 (40.3)	1.6 (34.9)	9.6 (49.3)
Mean daily minimum °C (°F)	−2.6 (27.3)	−2.6 (27.3)	−0.1 (31.8)	2.8 (37.0)	7.1 (44.8)	10.8 (51.4)	12.5 (54.5)	12.0 (53.6)	8.2 (46.8)	4.7 (40.5)	1.3 (34.3)	−1.3 (29.7)	4.4 (39.9)
Mean minimum °C (°F)	−12.6 (9.3)	−10.8 (12.6)	−7.0 (19.4)	−4.0 (24.8)	0.5 (32.9)	4.9 (40.8)	7.1 (44.8)	6.0 (42.8)	2.1 (35.8)	−2.5 (27.5)	−5.8 (21.6)	−11.2 (11.8)	−15.7 (3.7)
Record low °C (°F)	−29.7 (−21.5)	−25.7 (−14.3)	−19.6 (−3.3)	−9.7 (14.5)	−4.1 (24.6)	−1.0 (30.2)	1.4 (34.5)	0.7 (33.3)	−2.5 (27.5)	−7.5 (18.5)	−18.0 (−0.4)	−27.3 (−17.1)	−29.7 (−21.5)
Average precipitation mm (inches)	46.8 (1.84)	37.2 (1.46)	43.2 (1.70)	35.0 (1.38)	60.7 (2.39)	61.5 (2.42)	78.8 (3.10)	59.9 (2.36)	55.5 (2.19)	49.5 (1.95)	51.9 (2.04)	54.5 (2.15)	634.6 (24.98)
Average precipitation days (≥ 0.1 mm)	16.0	14.0	14.4	12.2	13.1	13.5	14.9	12.3	12.4	15.4	15.4	17.4	171.1
Average snowy days (≥ 1.0 cm)	8.1	6.3	2.1	0.1	0	0	0	0	0	0	1.3	4.2	26.0
Average relative humidity (%)	84.5	81.2	75.7	69.5	70.6	71.1	71.3	73.6	79.8	84.9	88.0	87.3	78.4
Mean monthly sunshine hours	52.0	79.4	124.2	181.2	209.4	220.6	230.4	218.9	159.3	102.9	48.8	39.4	1,666.6
Source 1: NOAA
Source 2: Infoclimat Source 3: Wetterdienst.de Source 4: Deutscher Wetterdienst

== Economy ==
Bamberg is considered an important economic center and is one of the 15 strongest economic regions in Bavaria compared to the other 95 districts and independent cities. Central locations for industry, manufacturing and trade can be found in the north and east of the city. In the north, around the Bamberg harbor, there is a large industrial area that partly extends into the Hallstadt urban area. Bosch operates one if its largest plant in Germany in the east and is also the city's most important employer.

Relevant economic sectors in Bamberg are the automotive supply industry, electrical engineering and the food industry. The traditional industry of market gardening with large inner-city cultivation areas, which has characterized the city since its beginnings, is still present. Due to its UNESCO World Heritage status and the more than 800,000 overnight guests a year in the city alone, tourism, hotels and gastronomy also play a central role in the city's economy.

=== Key economic figures ===
In the 2010s, Bamberg's gross domestic product increased by a total of 17.7%. The city of Bamberg generated €5.1 billion in 2021 (€66,543 per capita).

Gross domestic product (GDP) per capita in Bamberg
2010	2011	2012	2013	2014	2015	2016	2017	2018	2019	2020	2021
52.403	54.083	53.694	56.029	56.320	58.070	60.349	62.917	64.083	64.040	63.650	66.543

In the 2016 Future Atlas, Bamberg was ranked 32nd out of 402 districts, municipal associations and independent cities in Germany, making it one of the places with "very high future prospects".

The number of business registrations in the city of Bamberg remains at a high level. In the independent city of Bamberg, the number of business registrations in 2023 was 682, compared to 655 registrations the year before. In 2021, 702 new companies were registered with the city of Bamberg. The number of businesses in the city of Bamberg for 2023 is 2,624 companies. 87 of these businesses employ more than 100 people. Of these, almost half (969) are craft businesses.

=== Labour market and employment figures ===
As the population in the city has grown, the number of employees has also risen continuously in recent years: Between 2005 and 2022, the number of employees increased by almost 20%.

	2015	2016	2017	2018	2019	2020	2021	2022
Employees subject to social security contributions	52.259	53.181	54.078	54.695	54.478	57.435	55.414	56.491
Number of unemployed people	1.894	1.839	1.765	1.628	1.579	1.922	1.931	1.814

There are around 56,500 people in employment in the city in 2022. The unemployment rate in December 2022 was 4.3%, above the Bavarian average of 3.1%. In the neighboring district of Bamberg, the unemployment rate was 2.3%.

=== Industry and manufacturing ===
Important sectors of the manufacturing industry in Bamberg are drive technologies and electrical engineering. Bosch has been operating a production facility in Bamberg with over 6000 employees since 1939. The company produces energy, mobility and drive systems, in particular spark plugs for the automotive industry. Due to its dependence on the combustion engine, the company announced in 2019 that it would be switching to fuel cells,[145] although around 1000 jobs are to be transferred to other locations from 2026. Coburg-based automotive supplier Brose has had an administration building with 600 employees on Berliner Ring since 2016. Together with the plant in Hallstadt, the region is the company's second-largest location with more than 2,000 employees.

Another important company is Wieland Electric in the field of electrical engineering. The company was founded in Bamberg in 1910 and is considered a pioneer in electrical connection technology and is still the world market leader for pluggable installation technology in the building sector.

Rudolf Zimmermann Bamberg (RZB), with over 800 employees worldwide, produces lights and lighting systems near the port of Bamberg. Over 70 companies are located on the 100 hectares of the port. In 2023, over 416,000 tons of goods were loaded at the port, especially foodstuffs and bulk goods. In addition, over 700 river cruise ships docked here. The Bamberg asphalt mixing plant and a Schwenk concrete plant are also located in the immediate vicinity.

Bamberg is also home to numerous small and medium-sized companies in other sectors. One special feature here is the centuries-old tradition of instrument making. Organ building, which is currently being continued by master craftsman Thomas Eichfelder, is particularly noteworthy, as is the construction of violins, clarinets and other woodwind instruments.

=== Tourism and retail ===
Bamberg's city centre is characterized by a diverse retail sector, partly due to tourism. This generated a turnover of 682 million euros in 2023. In the 2018 shopping mile ranking by real estate company Jones Lang LaSalle (JLL), Bamberg was ranked first in Germany for cities with fewer than 100,000 inhabitants. With an average of 5,155 visitors per hour, the Grüner Markt was the 52nd most popular shopping street in Germany. In 2023, the Grüner Markt had almost 8.5 million passers-by, an increase of 130,000 visitors compared to the previous year.

Bamberg recorded 807,294 overnight stays in 2023, an increase of 11% compared to 2022. 85% of overnight guests came from Germany, 15% from abroad. The proportion of travelers from abroad rose particularly sharply in 2023 at 22%. The most important tourist countries of origin are the US, the Netherlands, Poland and Austria. Tourism generates around 330 million euros in gross revenue in Bamberg every year – in the hospitality, retail and service sectors. This results in an income of 153 million euros.

== Attractions ==
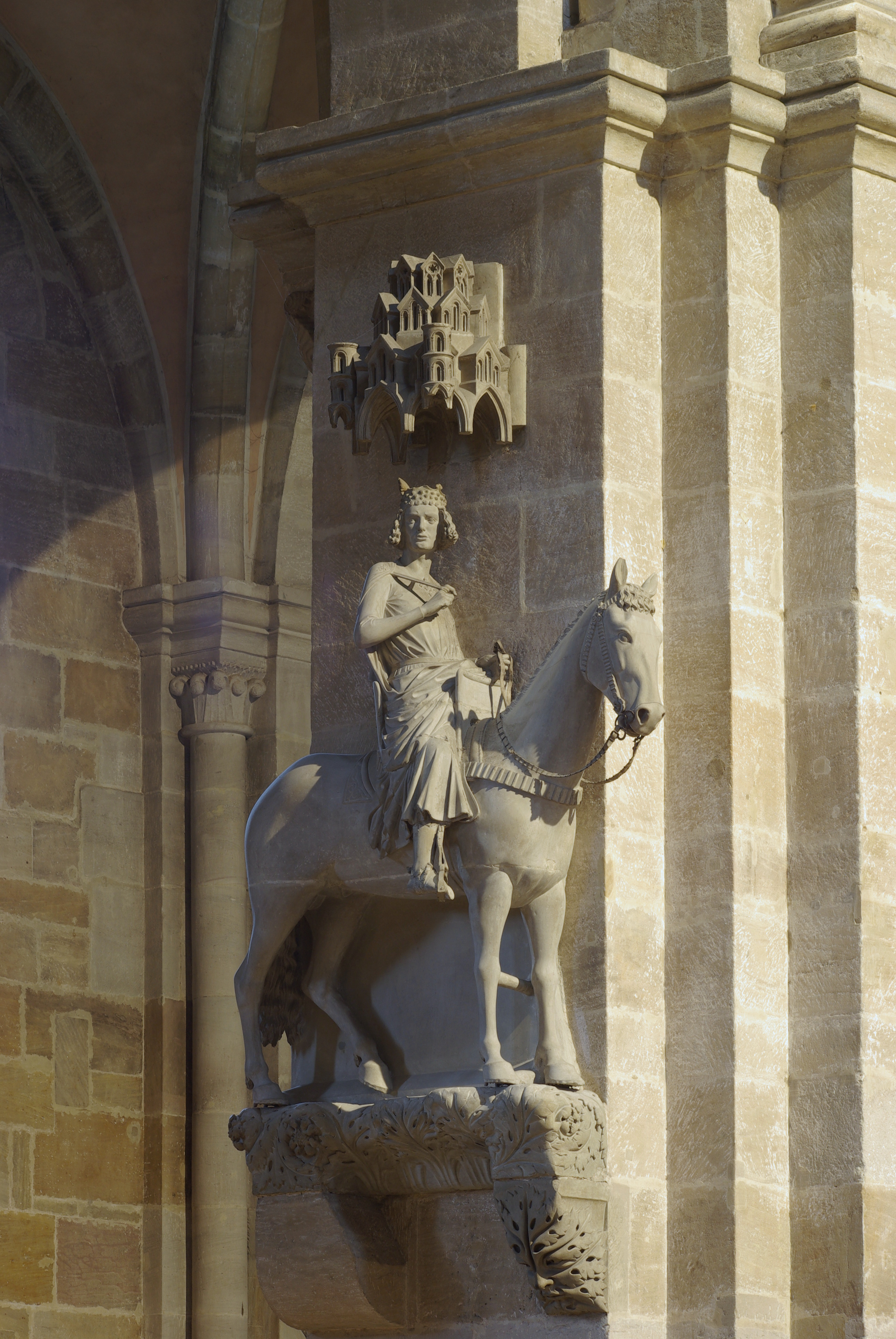
The Bamberg Horseman, a local symbol and the first near life-size stone equestrian statue since antiquity

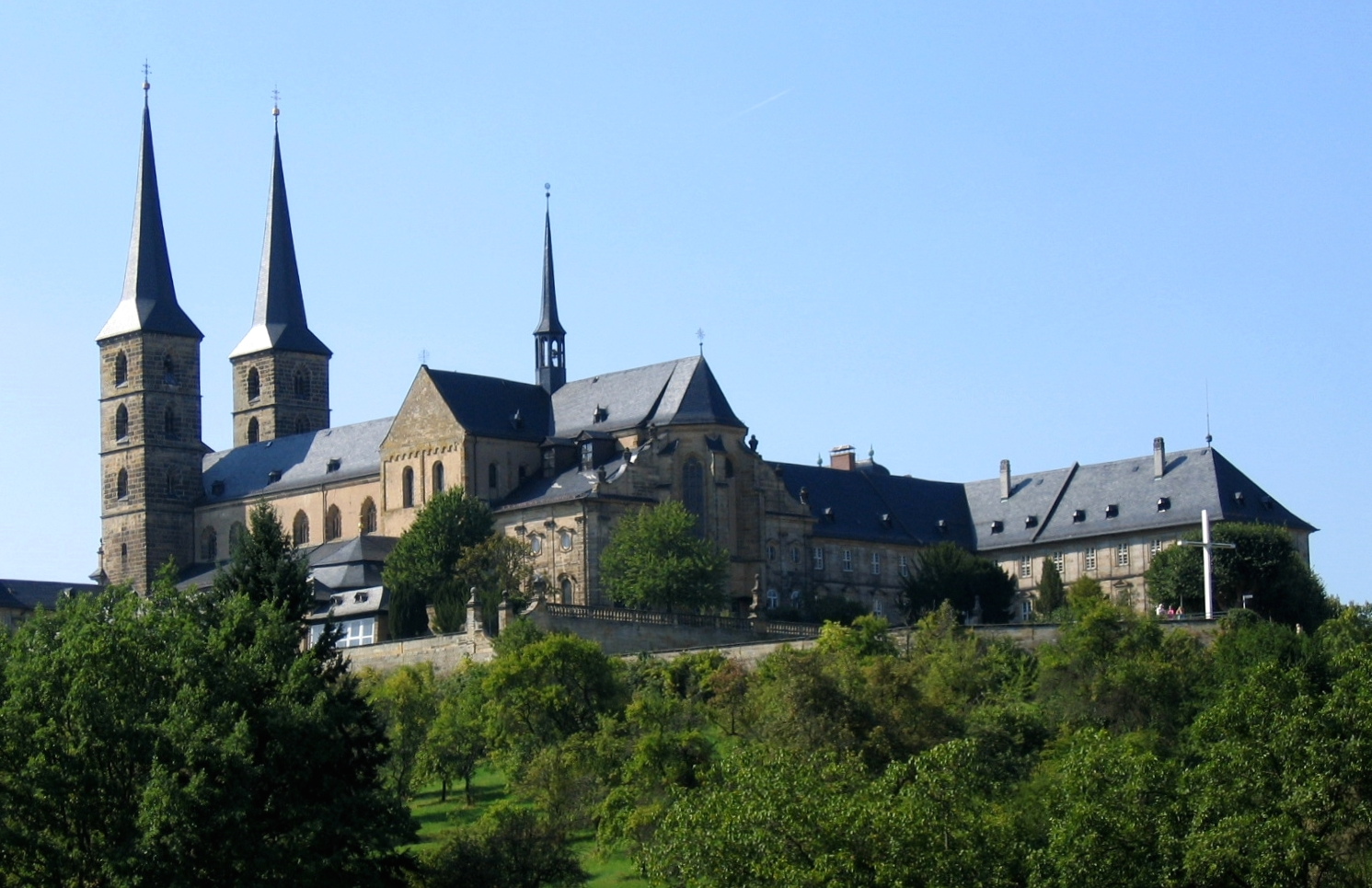
Michaelsberg Abbey

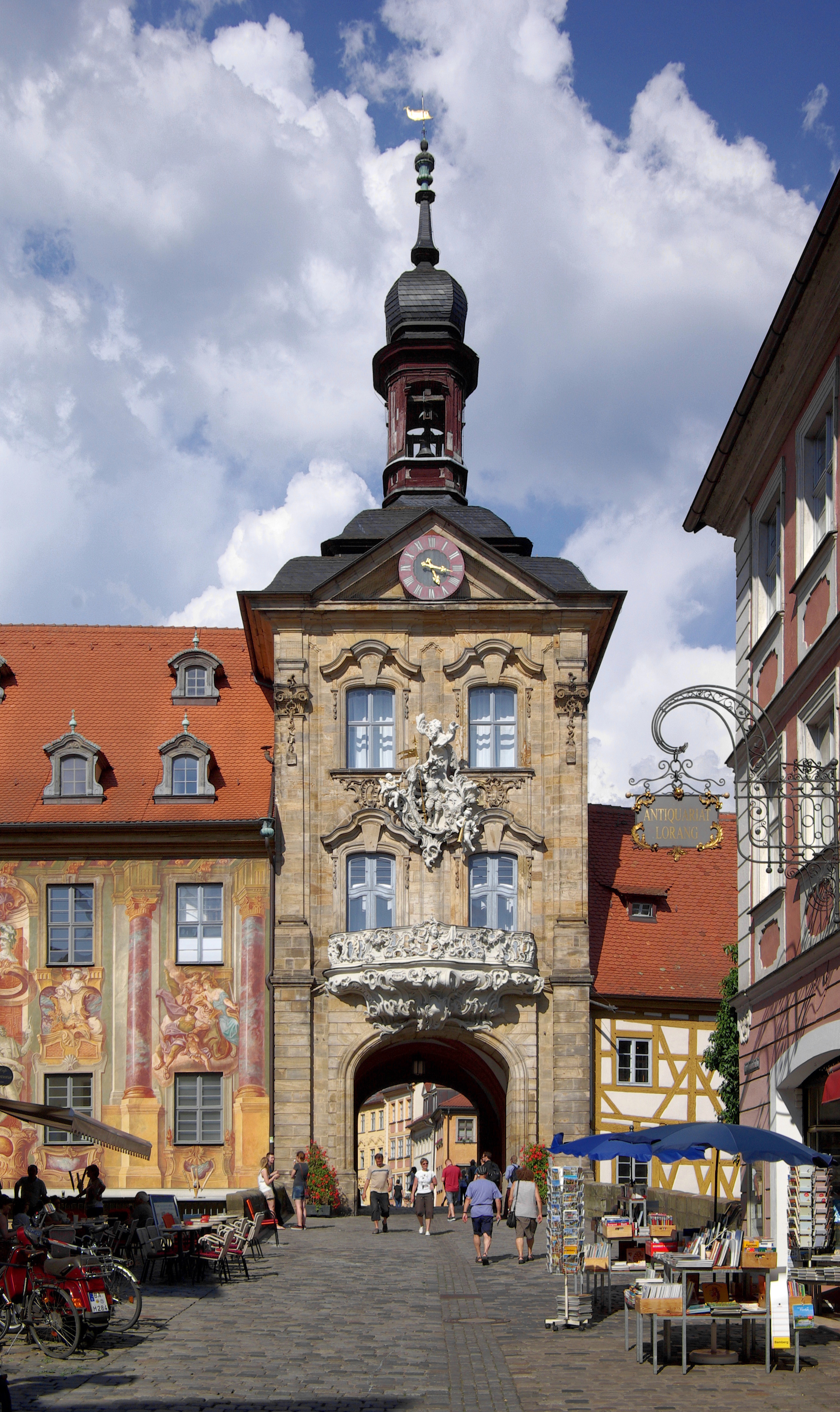
Town hall (Rathaus), details

The Town of Bamberg was inscribed on the UNESCO World Heritage List in 1993 due to its medieval layout and its well-preserved historic buildings. Since the Middle Ages, urban gardening has been practiced in Bamberg. The Market Gardeners’ District together with the City on the Hills and the Island District is an integral part of the World Heritage site. In 2005, the Municipality established a unit to coordinate the implementation of the World Heritage Convention in Bamberg. In 2019, a visitor and interpretation centre opened for the World Heritage site.

Some of the main sights are:

- Bamberg Cathedral (1237), with the tombs of Emperor Henry II and Pope Clement II
- Alte Hofhaltung, residence of the bishops in the 16th and 17th centuries
- Neue Residenz, residence of the bishops after the 17th century
- Bamberg State Library in the New Residence
- Old town hall (1386), built in the middle of the Regnitz river, accessible by two bridges
- Klein-Venedig ("Little Venice"), a colony of fishermen's houses from the 19th century along one bank of the river Regnitz
- Michaelsberg Abbey, built in the 12th century on one of Bamberg's "Seven Hills." The former Benedictine abbey, which once housed a brewery, is now home to the Franconian Brewery Museum.
- Altenburg, castle, former residence of the bishops

Cathedral

Bamberg Cathedral is a late Romanesque building with four towers. It was founded in 1002 by Emperor Henry II, finished in 1012 and consecrated on 6 May 1012. It was later partially destroyed by fire in 1081. The new cathedral, built by Saint Otto of Bamberg, was consecrated in 1111 and in the 13th century received its present late-Romanesque form.

The cathedral is 94 m (308 ft) long, 28 m (92 ft) wide, 26 m (85 ft) high, and the four towers are each about 81 m (266 ft) high. It contains many historic works of art, such as the marble tomb of the founder and his wife, considered one of the greatest works of the sculptor Tilman Riemenschneider, and carved between 1499 and 1513. Another treasure of the cathedral is an equestrian statue known as the Bamberg Horseman (Der Bamberger Reiter). This statue, possibly depicting the emperor Conrad III, most likely dates to the second quarter of the 13th century. The statue also serves as a symbol of the town of Bamberg.

Neue Residenz

The Neue Residenz (New Residence) (1698–1704) was initially occupied by the prince-bishops, and from 1864 to 1867 by the deposed King Otto of Greece. Its Rosengarten (Rose Garden) overlooks the town. It has over 4500 roses.

Altenburg

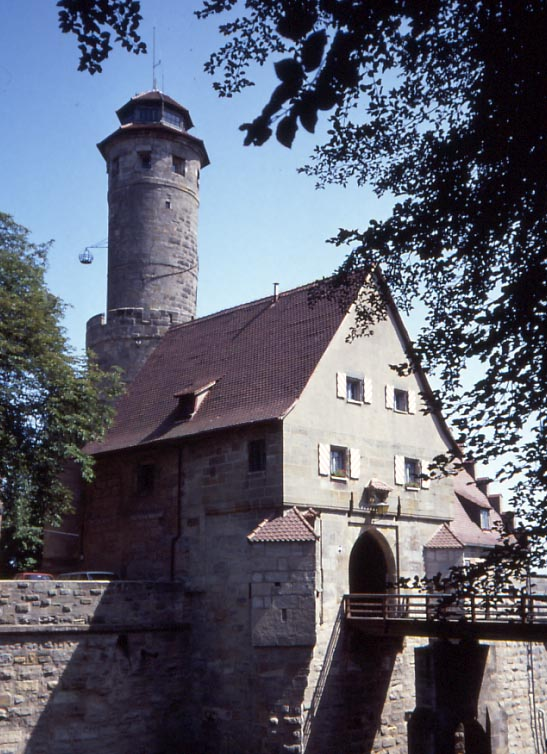
Bamberg Altenburg

The Altenburg is located on the highest of Bamberg's seven hills. It was mentioned for the first time in 1109. Between 1251 and 1553 it was the residence of Bamberg's bishops. Destroyed in 1553 by Albert Alcibiades, Margrave of Brandenburg-Kulmbach, it was used after scant repairs only as a prison, and increasingly fell into decay.

In 1801, A. F. Marcus bought the castle and completely repaired it. His friend, the famous German writer E.T.A. Hoffmann, who was very impressed by the building, lived there for a while. The next owner, Anton von Greifenstein, in 1818 founded an association to preserve the castle. This society still maintains the entire property today. The Altenburg today houses a restaurant.

Other sights

Other churches are the Jakobskirche, an 11th-century Romanesque basilica; the St. Martinskirche; the Marienkirche or Obere Pfarrkirche (1320–1387), which has now been restored to its original pure Gothic style. The Michaelskirche, 12th century Romanesque (restored), on the Michaelsberg, was formerly the church of the Benedictine Michaelsberg Abbey secularized in 1803 and now contains the Bürgerspital, or almshouse, and the museum and municipal art collections.

Of the bridges connecting the sections of the lower town the Obere Brücke was completed in 1455. Halfway across this, on an island, is the Rathaus or town hall (rebuilt 1744–1756). The lyceum, formerly a Jesuit college, contains a natural history museum. The old palace (Alte Hofhaltung) was built in 1591 on the site of an old residence of the counts of Babenberg. Monuments include the Maximilian fountain (1880), with statues of King Maximilian I of Bavaria, the emperor Henry II and his wife, Conrad III and Saint Otto, bishop of Bamberg.

There are also tunnels beneath the town. These were originally constructed as mines which supplied sandstone which could be used for construction or as an abrasive cleaner. Mining came to an end in 1920 but a 7.5 mi (12.1 km) tunnel network remained. The tunnels were used as an air raid shelter during World War II. A part of the network can be visited on a guided tour.

=== Beer ===
Bamberg is known for its smoked Rauchbier and is home to 11 breweries, including Brauerei Fässla, Brauerei Greifenklau, Brauerei Heller-Trum (Schlenkerla), Brauerei Kaiserdom, Keesmann Bräu, Klosterbräu, Mahrs Bräu, Brauerei Spezial, Gasthausbrauerei Ambräusianum, Kron Prinz, and Weyermann Röstmalzbierbrauerei. Weyermann Specialty Malting, founded in Bamberg in 1879, supplies breweries around the world. Every August there is a five-day Sandkerwa, a kirmess celebrated with beers. The Franconia region surrounding Bamberg is home to more than 200 breweries. In October and early November many of the 70 breweries in and around Bamberg celebrate Bockbieranstiche with special releases of Bock beer.

=== City of Bamberg commemorative 100 Euro coin (2004) ===
Commemorative 100 Euro gold coin 2004, celebrating the "UNESCO World Heritage Site - City of Bamberg"

The City of Bamberg commemorative 100 Euro coin is a gold coin issued by the Federal Republic of Germany in 2004 to celebrate the Town of Bamberg as a UNESCO World Heritage Site. Struck from .9999 fine gold at the Berlin Mint (indicated by the mintmark "A"), the coin was designed by the prominent artist Ulrich Böhme. The obverse features a detailed panoramic view of the historic townscape of Bamberg, depicting the Bamberg Cathedral, Michaelsberg Abbey, and the Old Town Hall, encircled by the inscription "STADT BAMBERG - UNESCO WELTKULTURERBE" (City of Bamberg - UNESCO World Cultural Heritage). The reverse displays the official German Federal Eagle surrounded by the twelve stars of the European Union, with the mintmark "A" positioned below its wing. The outer rim bears the inscription "BUNDESREPUBLIK DEUTSCHLAND - 100 EURO - 2004," indicating the issuing country, face value, and year of minting.

== Education ==
The University of Bamberg, named Otto-Friedrich University, offers higher education in the areas of social science, business studies and the humanities, and is attended by more than 12,000 students. The University of Applied Sciences Bamberg offers higher education in the areas of public health. Bamberg is also home to eight secondary schools (gymnasiums):

- Clavius-Gymnasium
- Dientzenhofer-Gymnasium
- Eichendorff-Gymnasium
- E.T.A. Hoffmann-Gymnasium
- Franz-Ludwig-Gymnasium
- Kaiser-Heinrich-Gymnasium
- Maria-Ward-Gymnasium
- Theresianum

There are also numerous other institutes for primary, secondary, technical, vocational and adult education.

== Infrastructure ==
=== Transport ===
==== Railway ====
The InterCityExpress main line No. 28 (Munich – Nuremberg – Leipzig – Berlin / – Hamburg) and the main line No. 18 (Munich – Nuremberg – Halle – Berlin / – Hamburg) run on the Nuremberg–Bamberg and the Bamberg–Hof lines through the Bamberg station. It takes less than two hours to Munich on the train and with the Nuremberg–Erfurt high-speed railway through the Thuringian mountains finished in 2017 less than three hours to Berlin. Two intercity trains of line no. 17 (Vienna – Warnemünde) and line no. 61 (Leipzig – Nuremberg – Karlsruhe) also run through Bamberg.

East-west connections are poorer. Bamberg is connected to other towns in eastern Upper Franconia such as Bayreuth, Coburg, and Kronach via the Bamberg–Hof line with trains usually running at least every hour. Connections on the Würzburg–Bamberg line to the west are hourly regional trains to Würzburg, which is fully connected to the ICE network. Tourists arriving at Frankfurt International Airport can take advantage of the new direct connection from Frankfurt's main station.

==== Motorways ====
Bamberg is not near any of the major (i.e. single-digit) autobahns. But it is nevertheless well connected to the network in all directions: the A70 from Schweinfurt (connecting to the A7 there) to Bayreuth (connecting to the A9) runs along the northern edge of the town. The A73 on the eastern side of town connects Bamberg to Nuremberg (connecting to the A9) and Thuringia, ending at Suhl.

==== Air transport ====
Bamberg is served by Bamberg-Breitenau Airfield. Mostly public aircraft operate there. It used to be a military airport. (IATA-Code: ZCD, ICAO-Code: EDQA) It is also possible to charter public flights to and from this airport.

Most international tourists who travel by plane arrive at Frankfurt International Airport or Munich Airport. The nearest major airport is Nuremberg Airport which can be reached within 45mins by car or one hour by train and subway.

==== Water transport ====
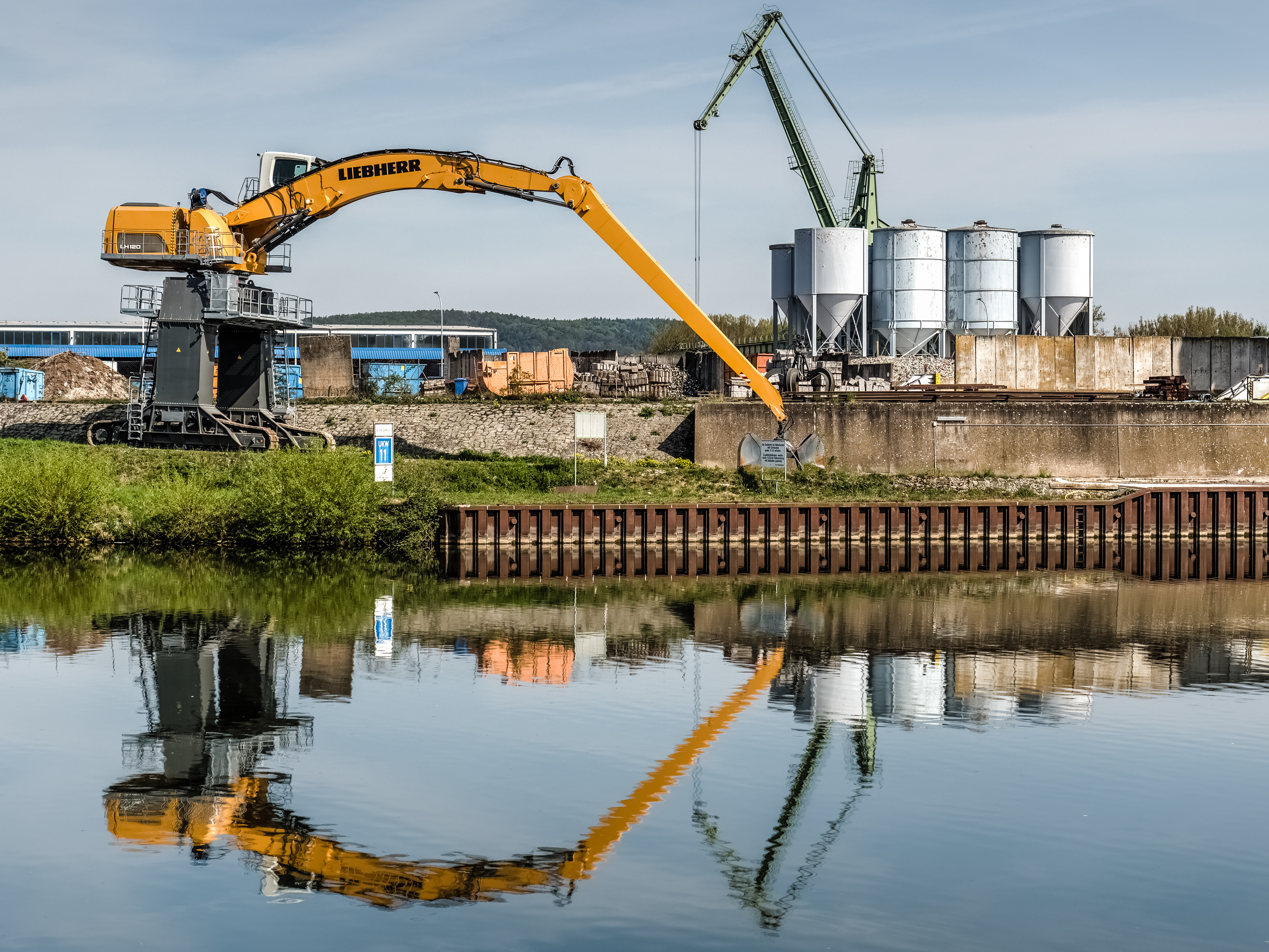
Cranes in Bamberg harbor

Both the Rhine-Main-Danube Canal and its predecessor, the Ludwig Canal, begin near Bamberg. The Ludwig Canal was opened in 1846 but closed in 1950 after damage during the second world war. With the completion of the Rhine-Main-Danube Canal in 1992, uninterrupted water transport was again made possible between the North Sea and the Black Sea.

==== Local public transport ====
Local public transport within Bamberg relies exclusively on buses. More than 20 routes connect the outlying quarters and some villages in the vicinity to the central bus station. In addition, there are several "Night Lines" (the last of these, though, tend to run around midnight) and some park-and-ride lines from parking lots on the periphery to the town centre.

A tram system operated from 1897 until 1922.

=== Military bases ===
Bamberg was an important base for the Bavarian, German, and then American military stationed at Warner Barracks. Warner Barracks was closed in the fall of 2014, with the last battalion leaving being the 54th Engineer Battalion, and the grounds returned to the German government. In 2016, a large part of the facility was taken over by the German Federal Police for training purposes. Muna Kasserne was a small base occupied by the 504th Maintenance Company, 71st Maintenance Bn. It was part of Warner Barracks although located separately.

== Governance ==
Bamberg is an urban district, or kreisfreie Stadt. Its town council (Stadtrat) and its mayor (Oberbürgermeister) are elected every six years, though not in the same year. Thus, the last municipal election for the town council was in 2014, for the mayor in 2012. As an exception to the six-year term, the term starting in 2012 will take eight years to synchronize the elections with those in the rest of Bavaria.

As of the elections of 15 March 2020, the 44 member strong town council comprises 11 CSU councillors, 11 Green councillors, 6 SPD councillors, 3 councillors of the Bamberger Bürger-Block and 3 of the BuB-Stadtratsfraktion, both local political movements. These five parties achieved the number of councillors necessary to form a parliamentary group. In addition, there are 2 councillors of the Bamberger Unabhängige Bürger, 2 councillors of the AfD and the BaLi and two committee groups – the FW-FDP and the VOLT-öpd, each consisting of two members.

The previous council, elected on 2 March 2008, was composed of 15 CSU councillors, 10 SPD councillors, 7 Green councillors, 5 councillors of the Bamberger Bürger-Block and 3 of the Freie Wähler (Free Voters), both local political movements. These five parties achieved the number of councillors necessary to form a parliamentary group. In addition, there were 2 councillors of the Bamberger Realisten and one of the FDP and the Republikaner, making them ineligible for caucus status.

=== Mayors since 1945 ===
Years	Mayor	Party
1945–1958	Luitpold Weegmann	CSU
1958–1982	Theodor Mathieu	CSU
1982–1994	Paul Röhner	CSU
1994–2006	Herbert Lauer	Independent
2006–present	Andreas Starke	SPD

== Twin towns – sister cities ==
Bamberg is twinned with:

- Bedford, England, United Kingdom
- Esztergom, Hungary
- Feldkirchen in Kärnten, Austria
- Prague 1, Czech Republic
- Rodez, France
- Villach, Austria

== Notable people ==
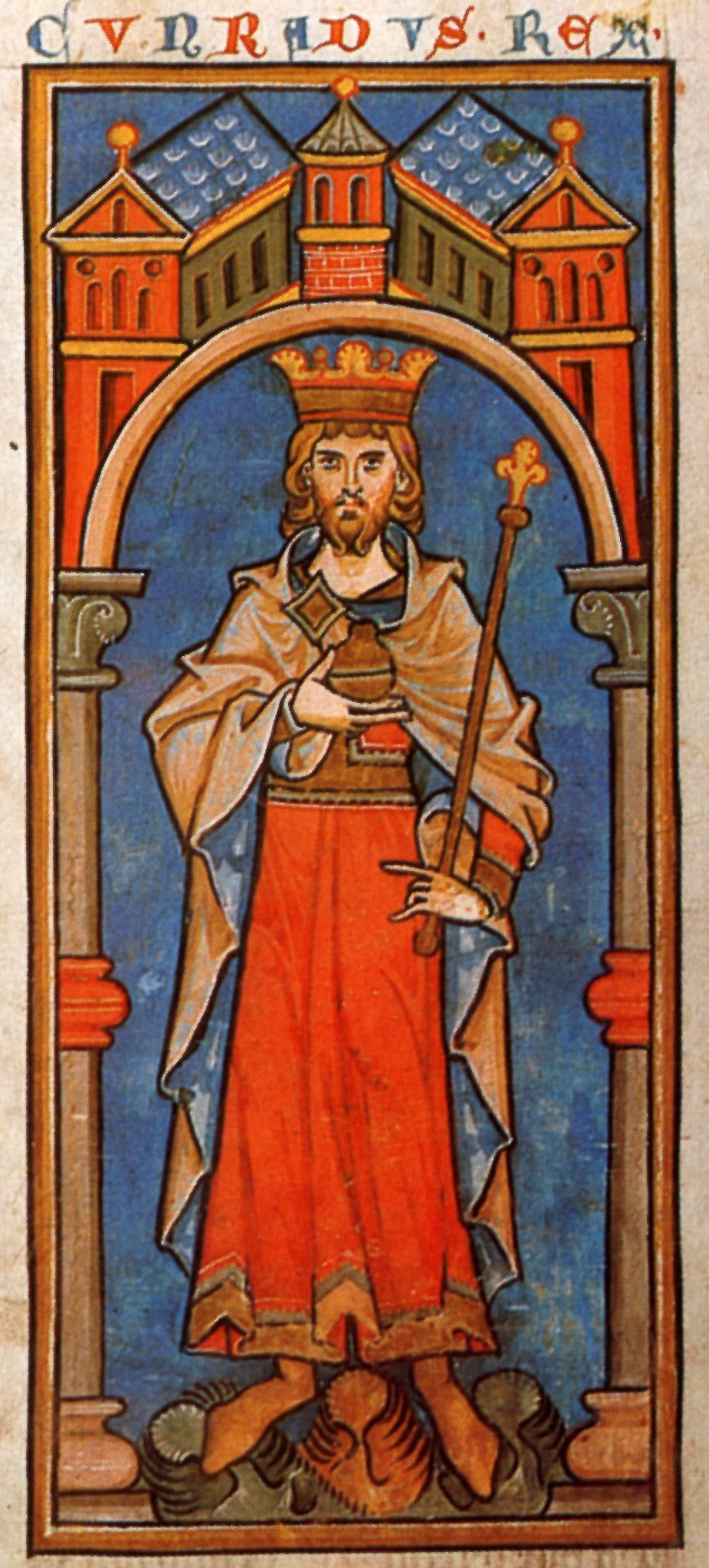
Conrad III of Germany, c. 1240

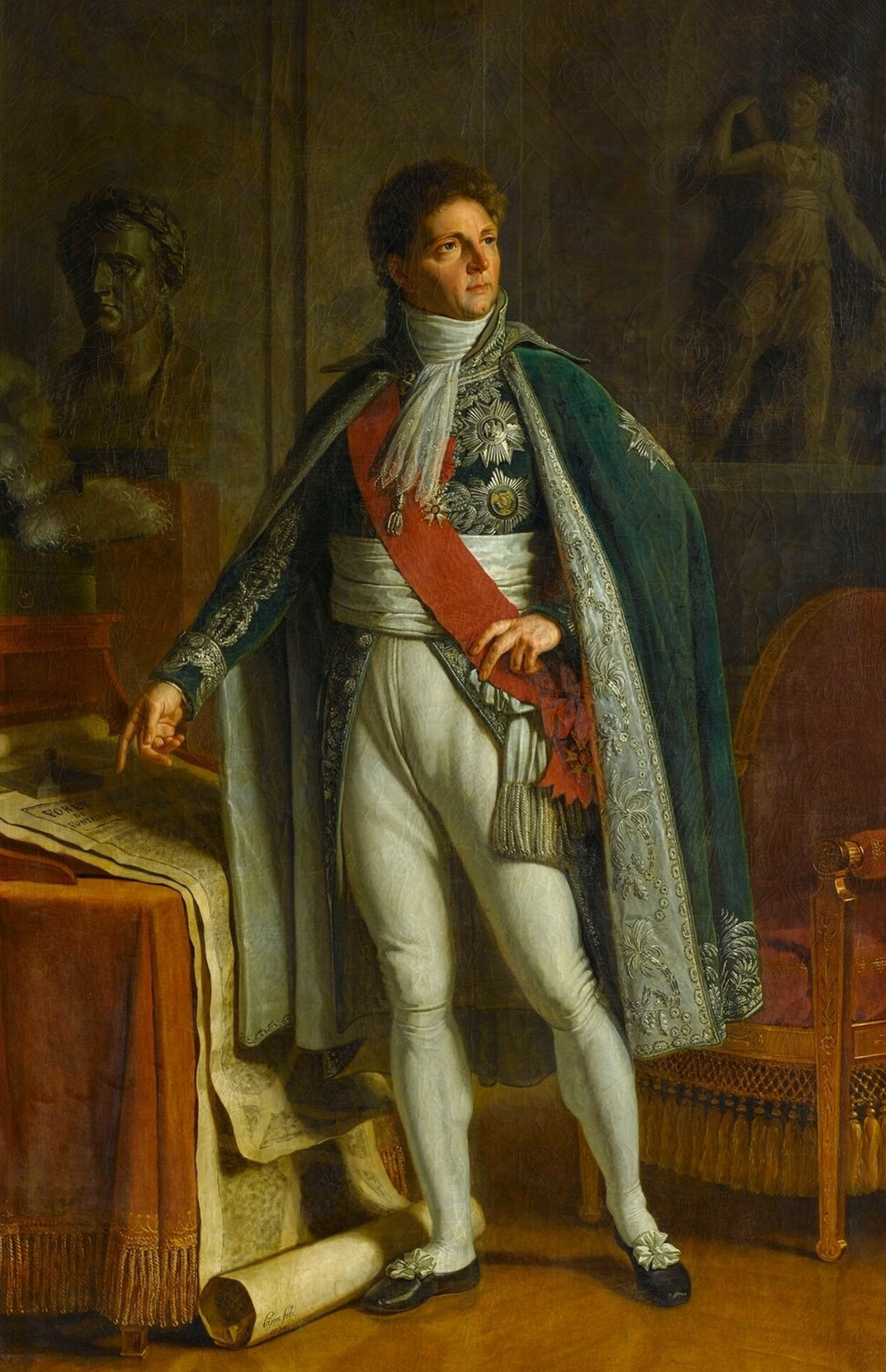
Louis-Alexandre Berthier, 1808

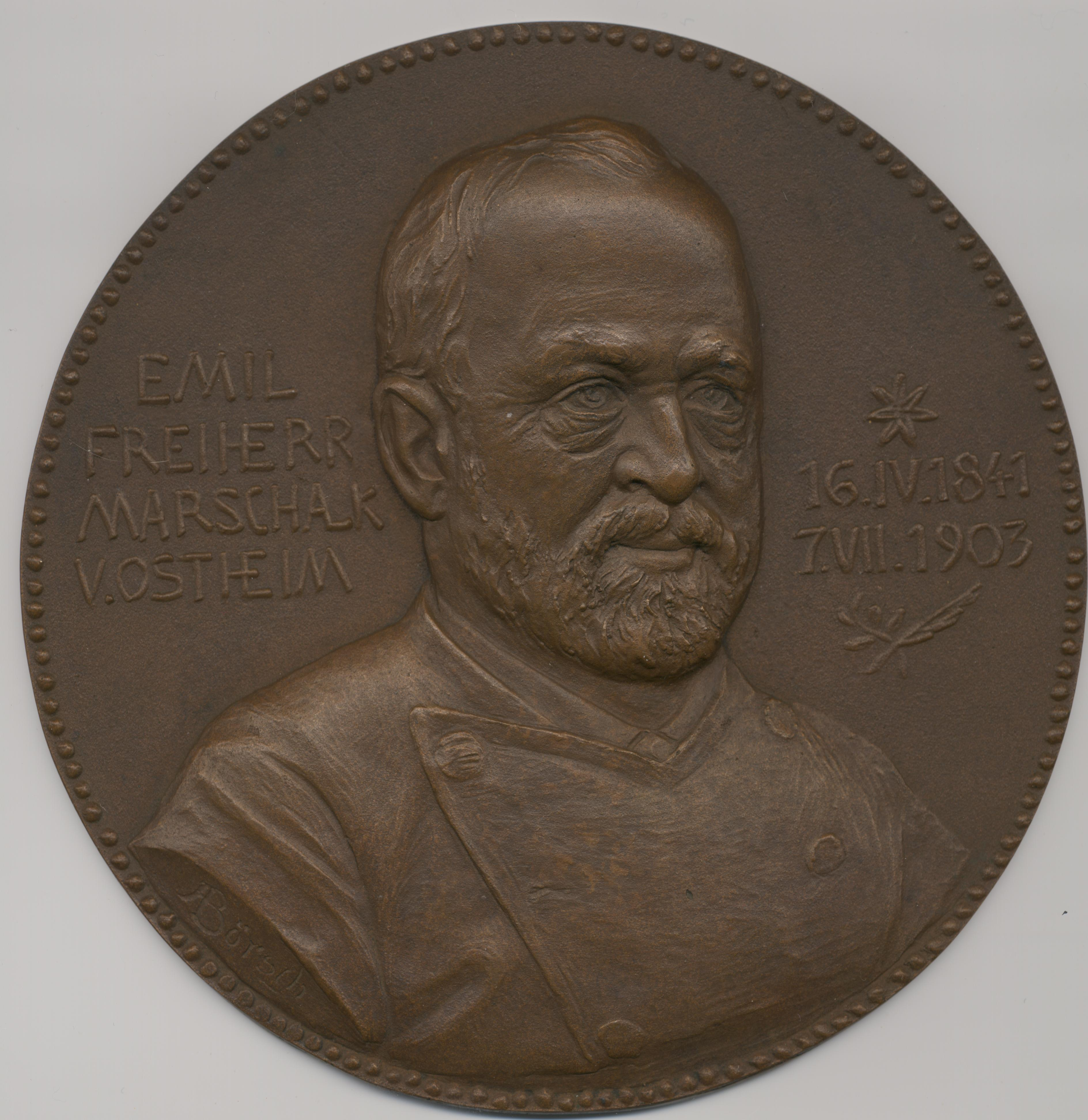
Emil Marschalk von Ostheim, 1903

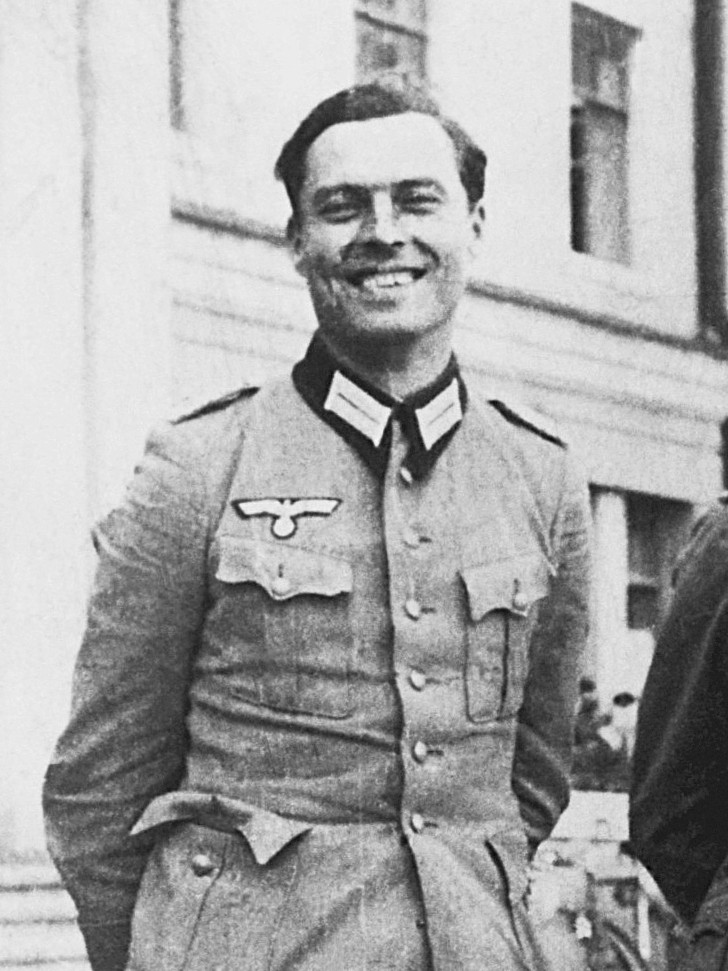
Claus von Stauffenberg, 1944

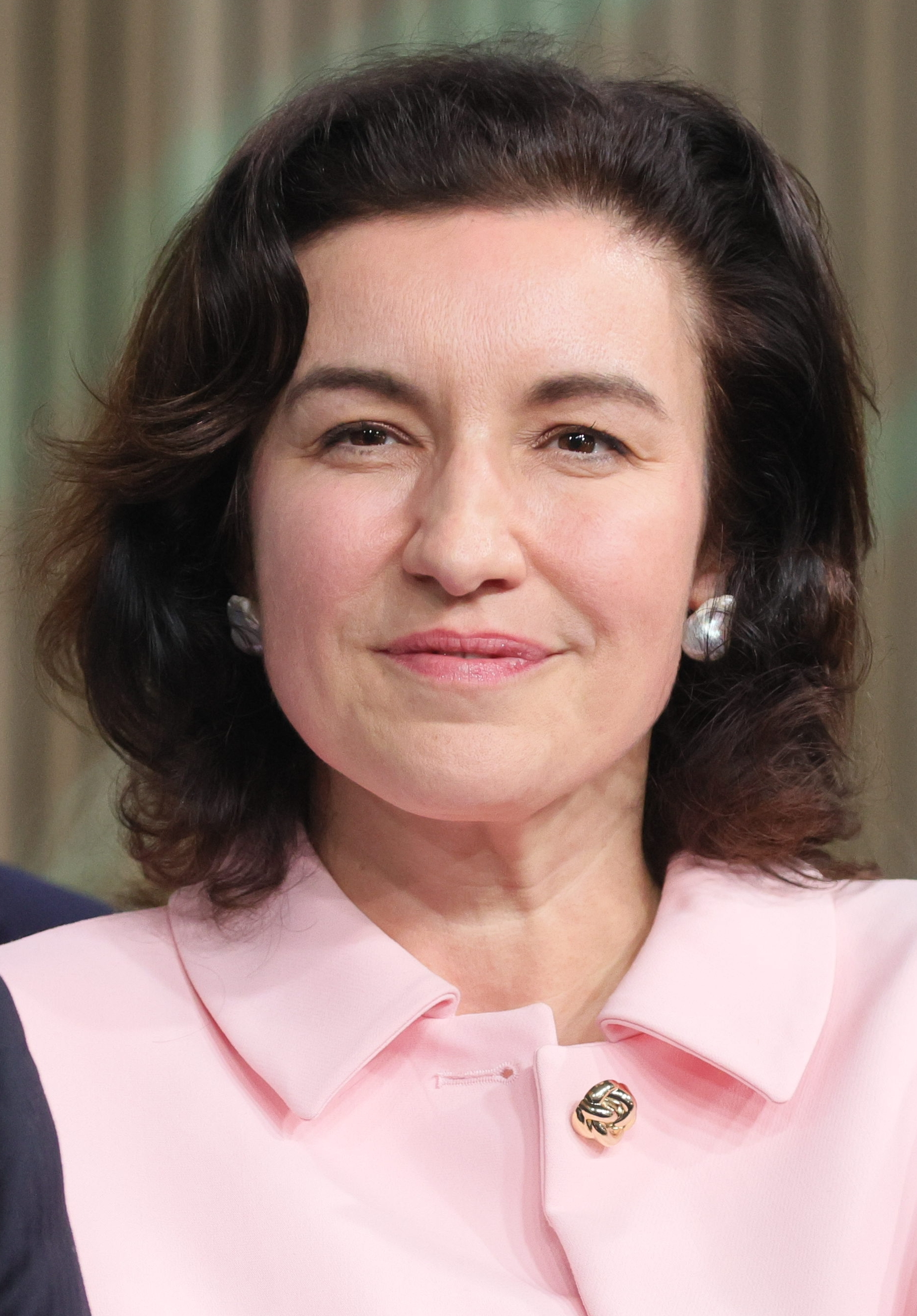
Dorothee Bär, 2025

- Henry II (973–1024), Holy Roman Emperor
- Cunigunde of Luxembourg (c. 975–1040), empress consort, regent of the Holy Roman Empire and wife of Henry II
- Pope Clement II (died 1047), bishop of Bamberg from 1040 to 1046
- Ulrich of Bamberg (c. 1100), Roman Catholic priest and chronicler
- Conrad III of Germany (1093–1152), king of Germany
- Heinrich Finck (1444–1527), conductor and composer
- Johann of Schwarzenberg (1463–1528), moralist, reformer and judge of the episcopal court at Bamberg
- Paul Lautensack (1478–1558), painter and organist
- Joachim Camerarius (1500–1574), humanist, polymath and poet
- Christopher Clavius (1538–1612), mathematician, astronomer and Jesuit
- Johannes Junius (1573–1628), Mayor of Bamberg, and a victim of the Bamberg witch trials
- Christina Morhaubt (died 1627), convicted of witchcraft and sentenced to death by burning during the Bamberg witch trials
- Georg Haan (died 1628), prominent victim of the Bamberg witch trials
- Dominic Schram (1722-1797), Benedictine theologian and canonist
- Louis-Alexandre Berthier (1753–1815), Chief of Staff to Napoleon Bonaparte
- Ignaz Dollinger (1770–1841), physician
- Georg Wilhelm Friedrich Hegel (1770–1831), German philosopher
- E. T. A. Hoffmann (1776–1822), German author and composer
- Martin Münz (1785–1848), anatomist and professor
- Karl Adam Bader (1789-1870), cathedral organist and Berlin Court Opera tenor
- Joseph Wolff (1795–1862), an Anglican missionary, known as "the missionary to the world"
- Joseph Heller (1798–1849), collector, today Helleriana in Bamberg State Library
- Ignaz von Dollinger (1799–1890), important Catholic theologian and church historian
- Duke Maximilian Joseph in Bavaria (1808–1888), promoter of Bavarian folk music in the 19th century
- Amélie Linz (1824–1904), author who wrote books for children and adults
- Josef von Schmitt (1838–1907), German noble, Court President for the Kingdom of Bavaria, advisor to Prince Luitpold of Bavaria, Privy councilor and an Honorary Citizen of Bamberg
- Emil Marschalk von Ostheim (1841–1903), historian and collector
- Karl von Gareis (1844–1923), a lawyer and author, member of the Reichstag
- Theodor Boveri (1862–1915), biologist and cytogeneticist
- Gottfried Schmitt (1865–1919), German politician
- Lily Reiff (1866–1958), composer and pianist
- Oscar Wassermann (1869–1934), German banker
- Josef Schmitt (1875–1944), German noble and Privy councillor
- Lorenz Krapp (1882–1947), lawyer, poet and politician (BVP, CSU)
- Ida Noddack, (1896–1978), chemist and physicist; she discovered element 75, rhenium.
- Willy Messerschmitt (1898–1978), German aircraft designer, Flugzeugbau Messerschmitt GmbH
- Marie Dessauer (1901–1986), economist
- Karl Höller (1907–1987), composer of the late Romantic tradition
- Claus von Stauffenberg (1907–1944), German officer, attempted assassination of Adolf Hitler in the 20 July Plot.
- Gottfried Diener (1907–1987), philologist and Goethe researcher
- Wilhelm Batz (1916–1988), Luftwaffe, ace
- Karlheinz Deschner (1924–2014), writer and critic of religion and the church
- Wolf-Dieter Montag (1924–2018), physician, sports medicine specialist and mountain rescue doctor
- Mike Rose (1932–2006), painter, set designer and writer, died locally
- Albert von Sachsen (1934–2012), head of the Royal House of Saxony and German historian
- Berthold Maria Schenk Graf von Stauffenberg (born 1934), former General of the Bundeswehr
- Franz-Ludwig Schenk Graf von Stauffenberg (born 1938), former Bavarian EU parliament member
- Paul Maar (born 1937), German writer and illustrator, lives locally
- Dieter Kunzelmann (born 1939), communard and left-wing activist
- Thomas Gottschalk (born 1950), moderator, TV presenter, and actor
- Joachim Jung (born 1951), artist
- Klaus-Dieter Fritsche (born 1953), jurist and politician (CSU)
- Hans Grassmann (born 1960), physicist and author
- Bernd Redmann (born 1965), composer and musicologist
- Gerd Schaller (born 1965), conductor, particularly of Bruckner
- Rainer Schaller (born 1969–2022), entrepreneur and founder of McFit Fitness GmbH
- Dorothee Bär (born 1978), Member of Parliament (CSU), Federal Ministry of Research, Technology and Space since 2025
- Nora-Eugenie Gomringer (born 1980), poet and writer
- Lisa Badum (born 1983), politician
- Claudia Ciesla (born 1987), Polish-German actress

=== Sport ===
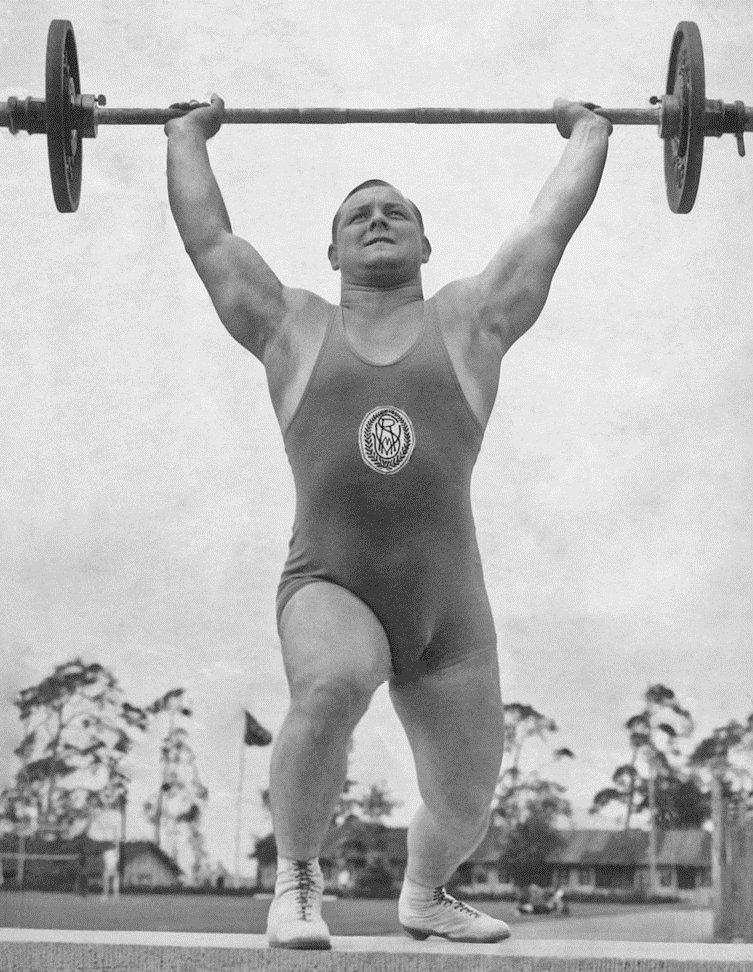
Josef Manger, 1936

- Josef Manger (1913–1991), heavyweight weightlifter, gold medallist at the 1936 Summer Olympics
- Karl Bögelein (1927–2016), football goalkeeper, played 320 games
- Harald Spörl (born 1966), footballer who played 333 games
- Harry Koch (born 1969), football player, played over 320 games
- Martin Meichelbeck (born 1976), footballer who played 250 games
- Sven Schultze (born 1978), basketball player
- Thomas Kraus (born 1987), footballer, played over 450 games
- Tom Schütz (born 1988), football player, played 390 games
- Karsten Tadda (born 1988), basketball player
- Andrew Wooten (born 1989), German-American soccer player, played about 400 games
- Fabian Baumgärtel (1989), footballer who has played over 400 games
- Lukas Görtler (born 1994), football player, played over 370 games

== Gallery ==
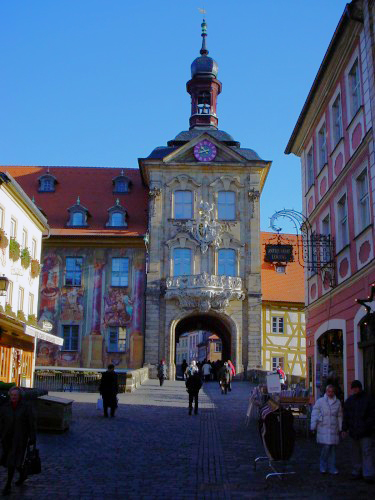
Old town hall

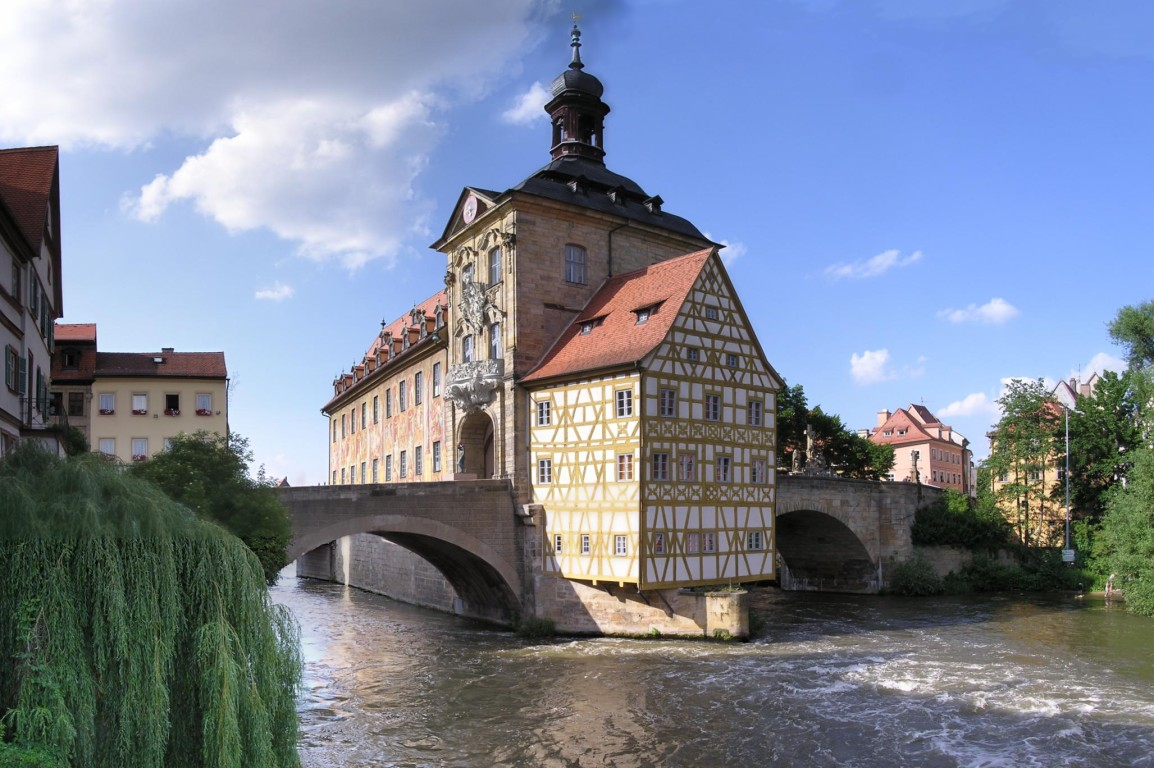
Old town hall with both bridges

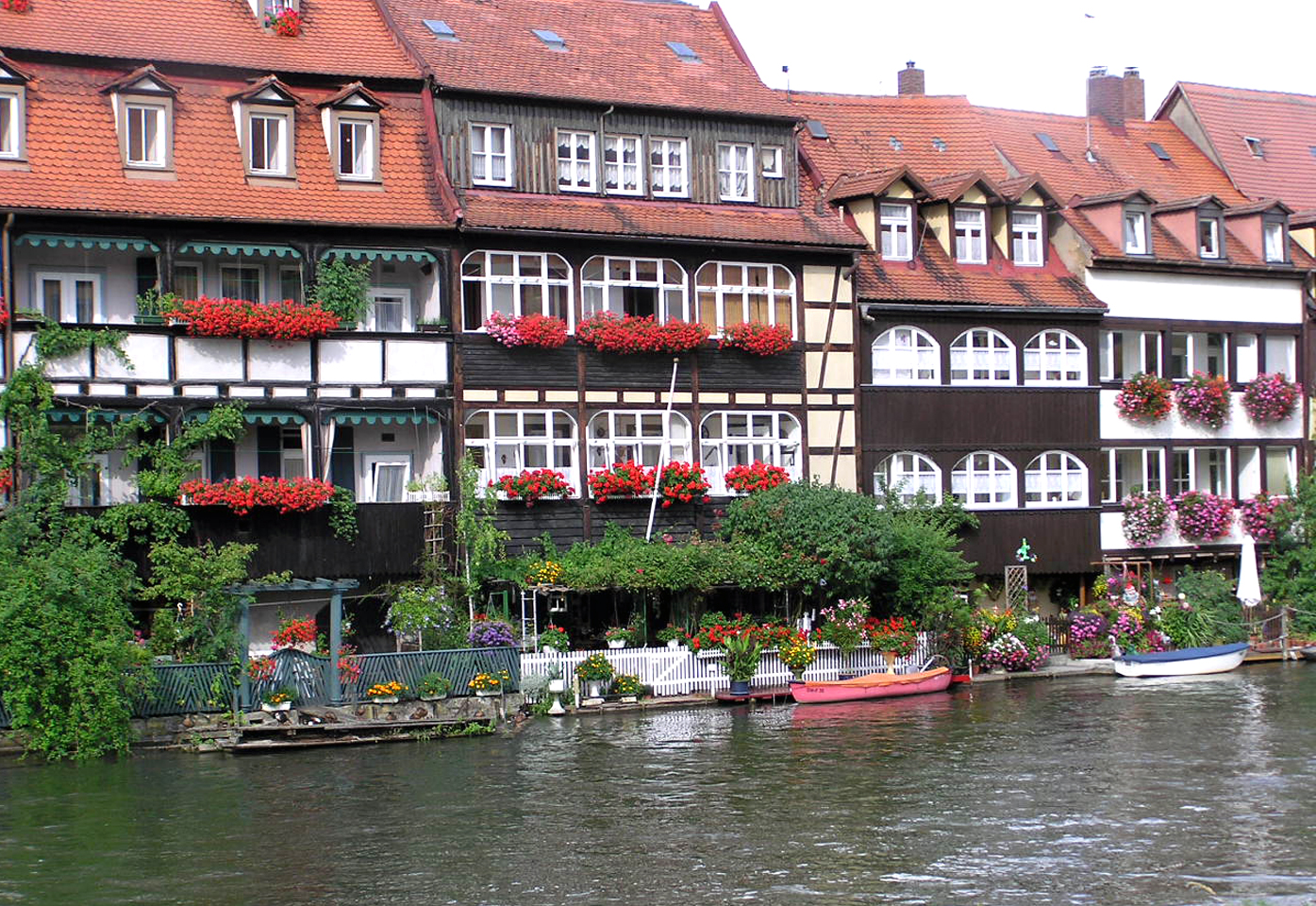
Close-up of "Little Venice"

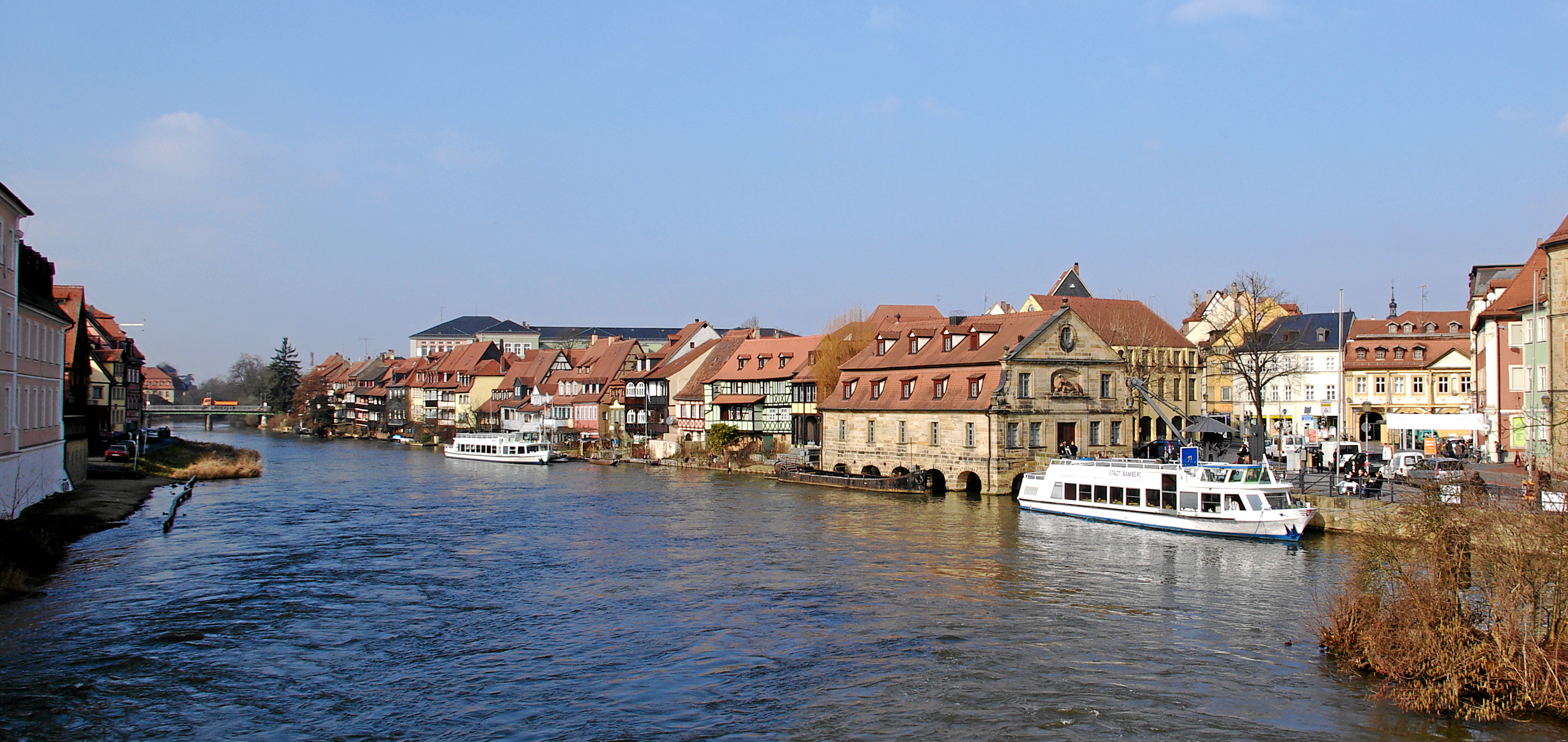
"Little Venice"

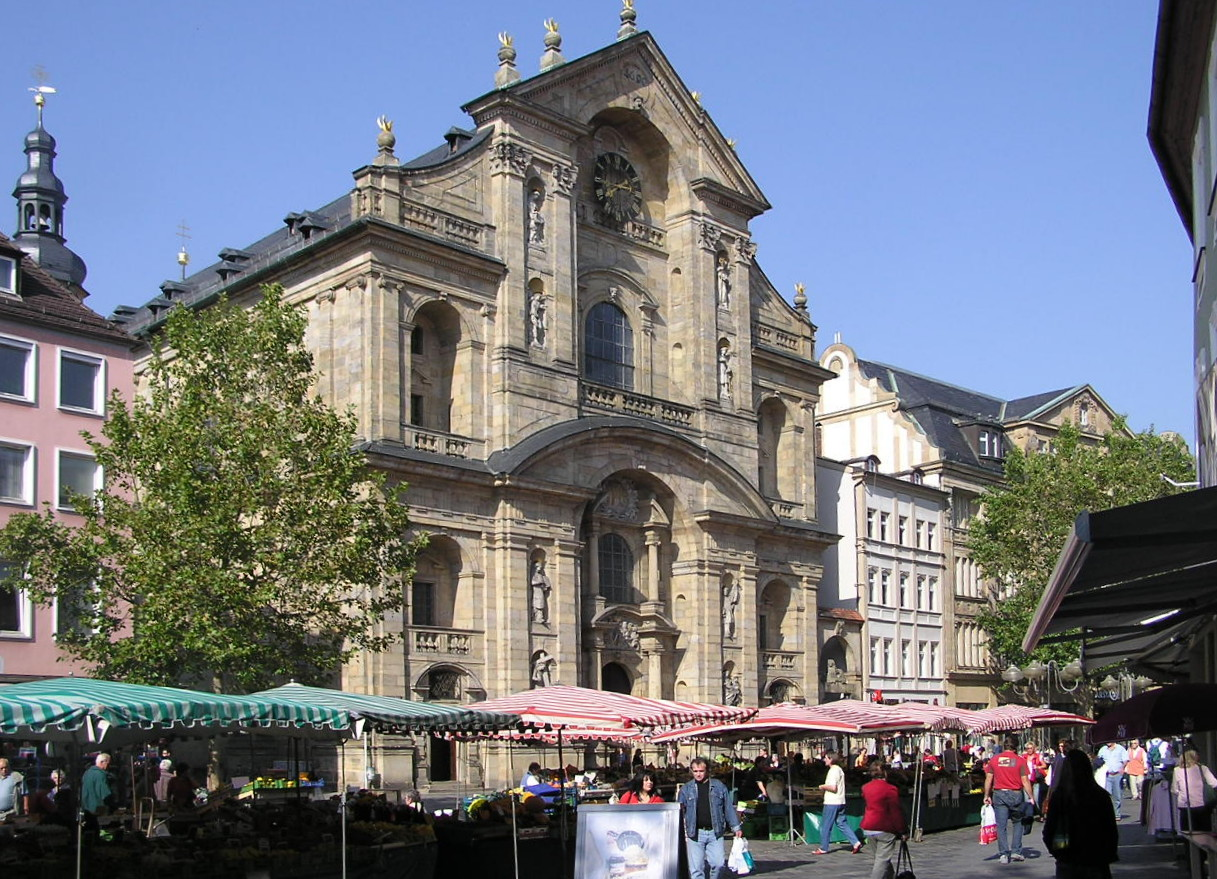
St Martin and Green Market

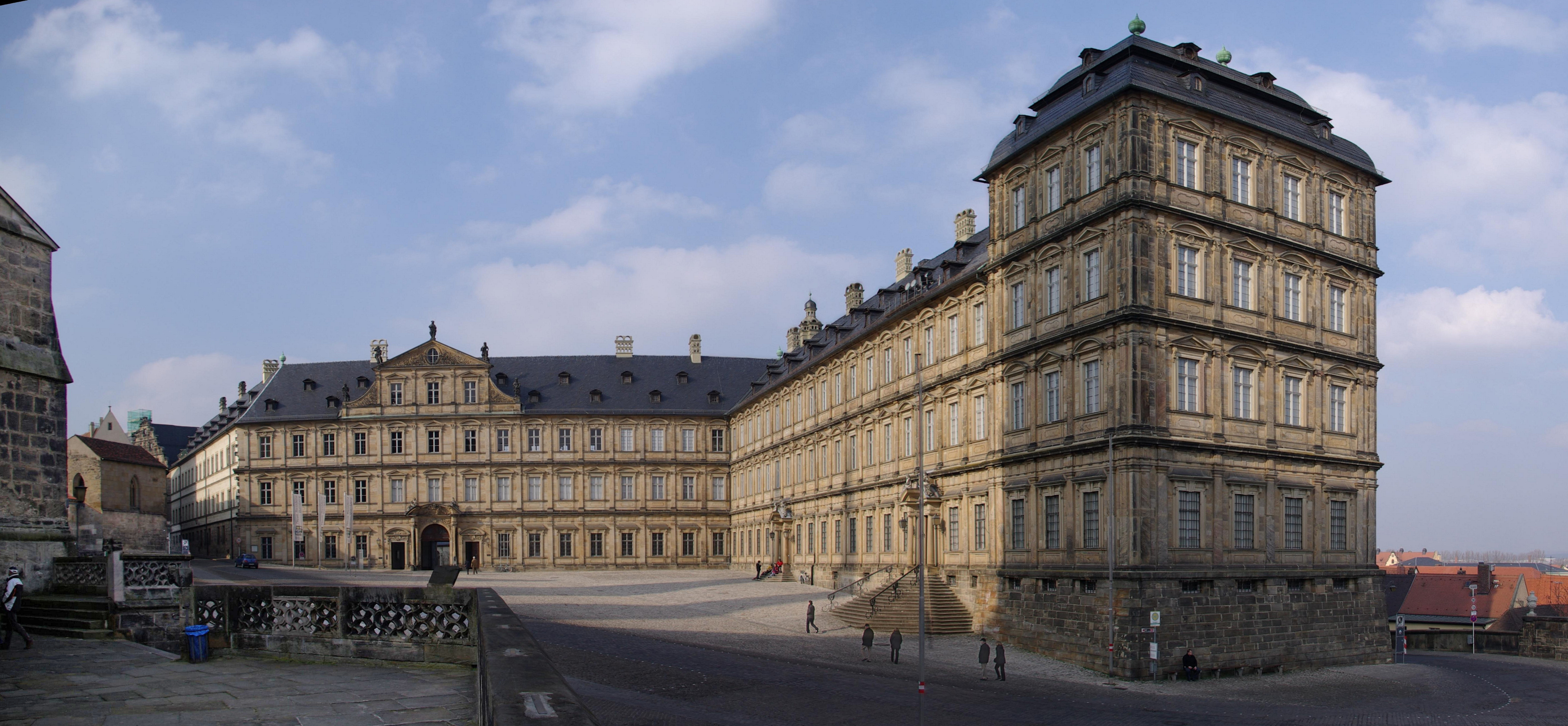
Neue Residenz (the "New Residence" of the prince-bishops)

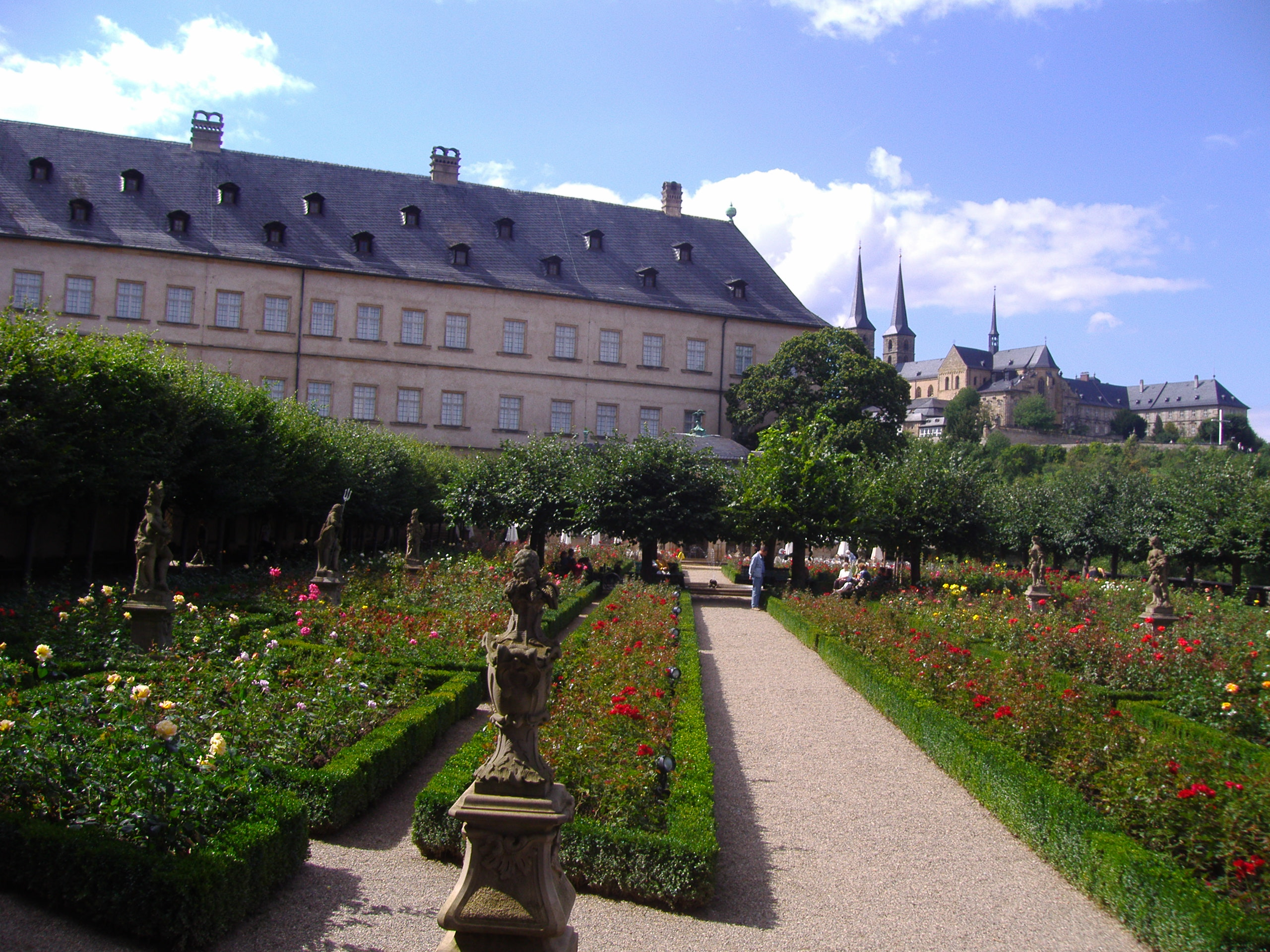
The Rose Garden at the Neue Residenz

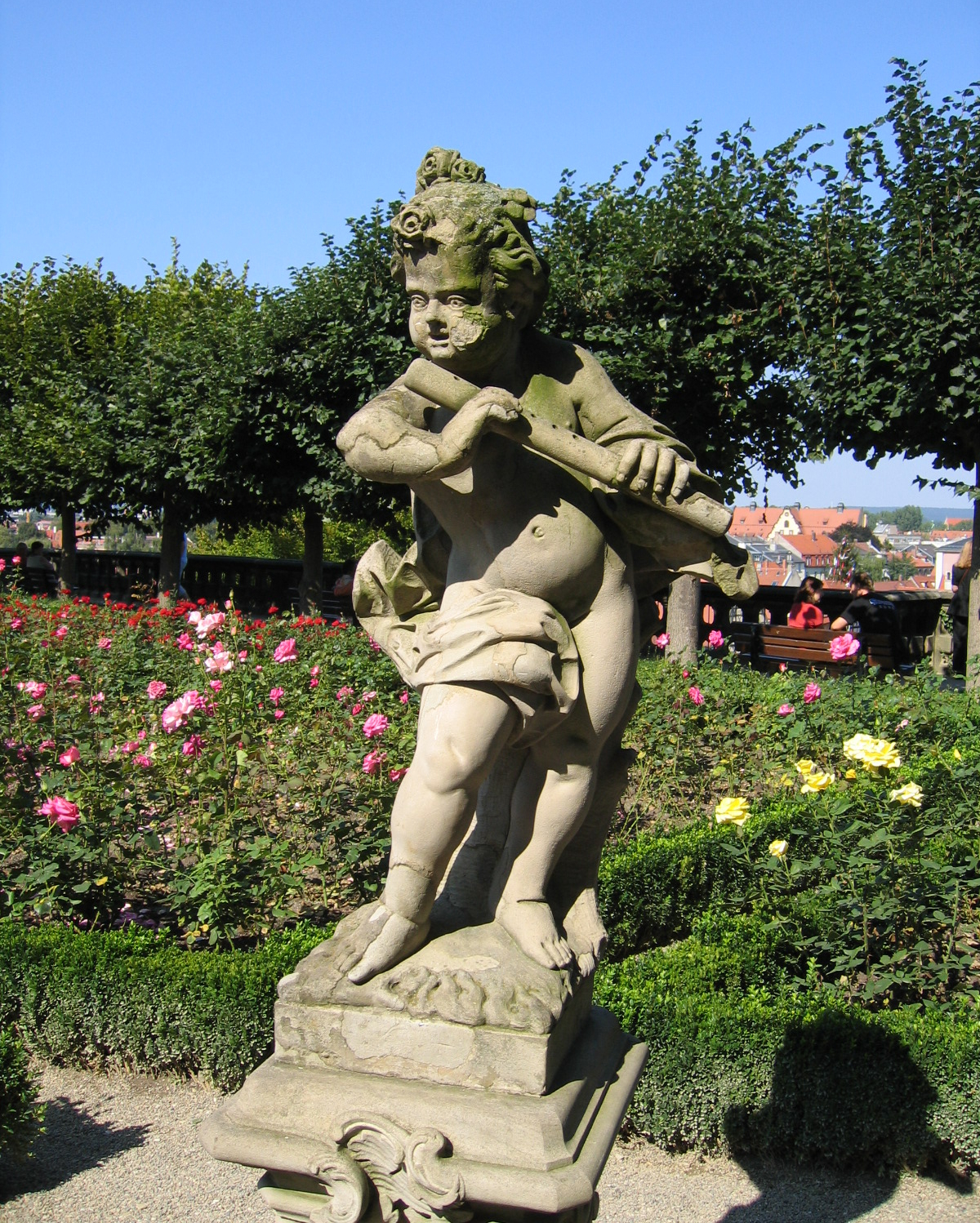
Rose Garden detail

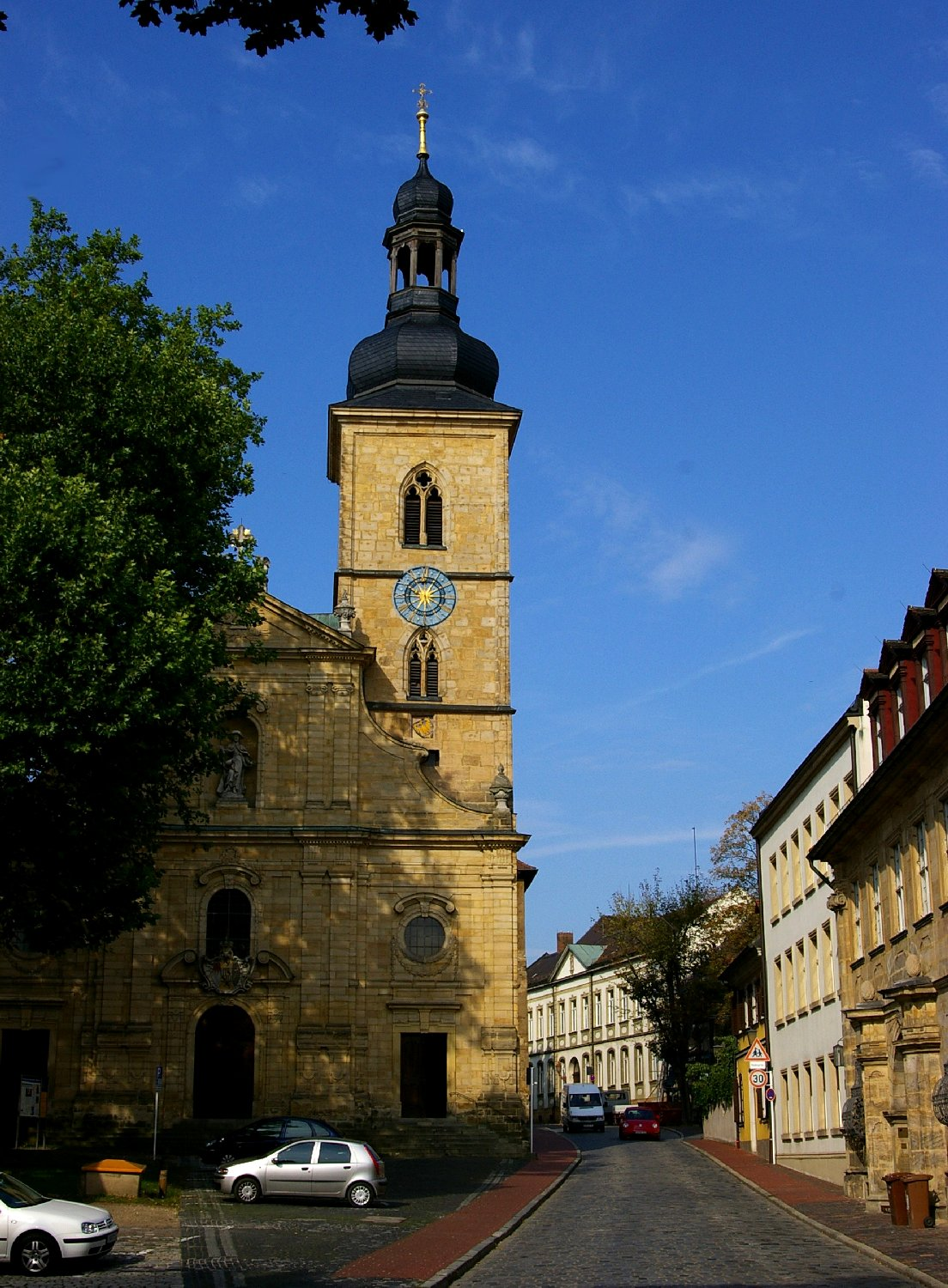
Church of St Jacob

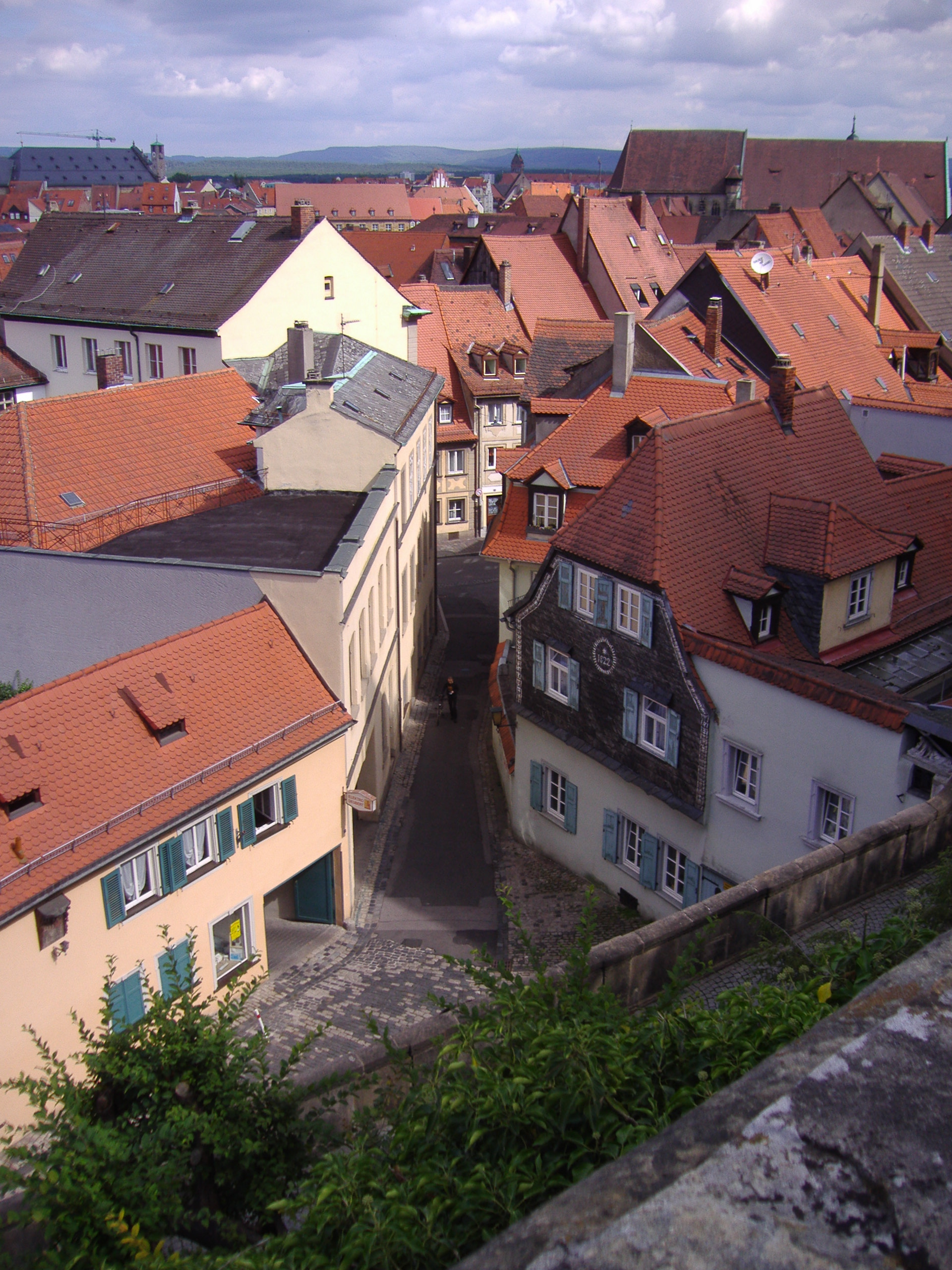
Bamberg rooftops from the Rose Garden

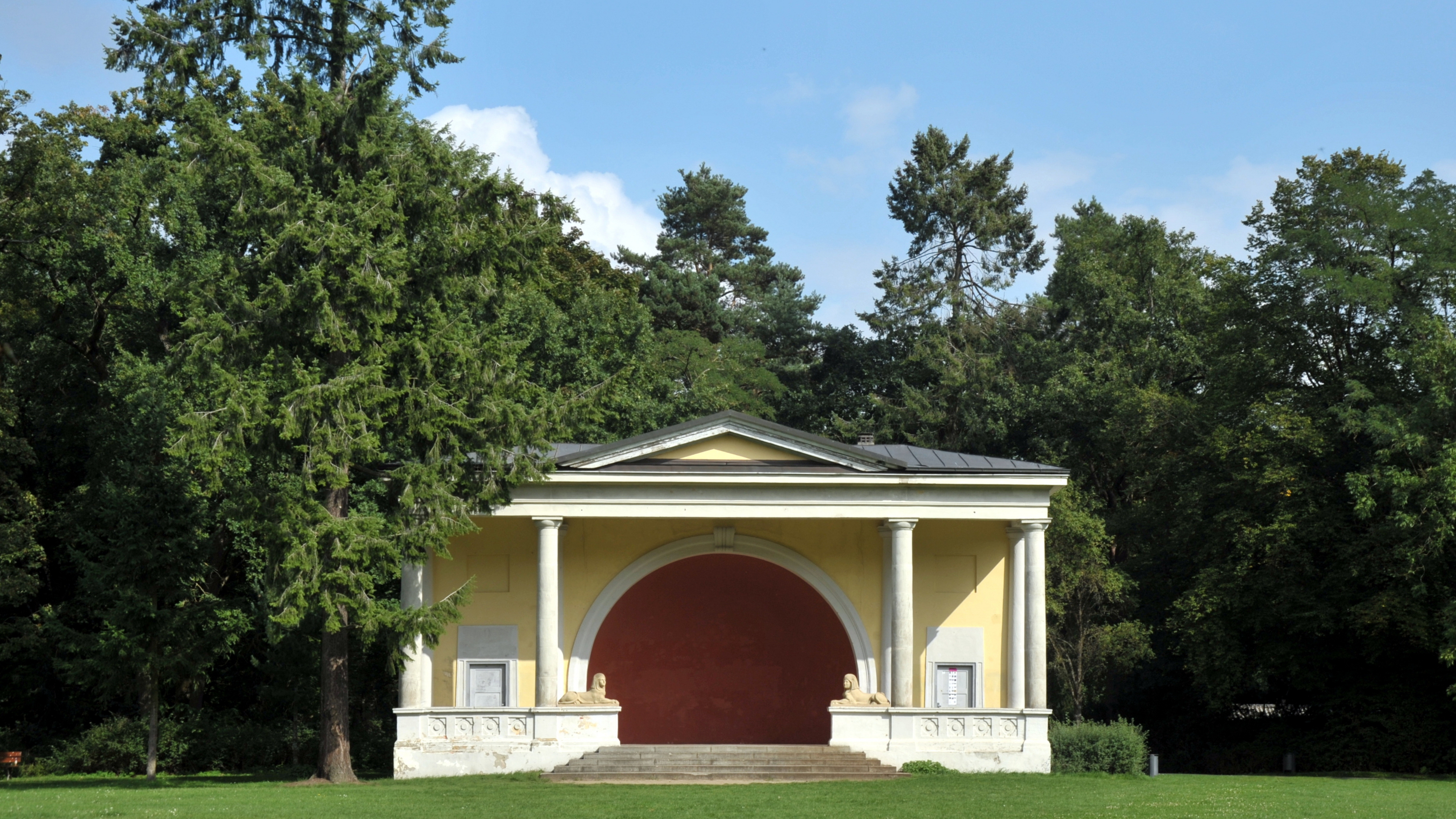
Music pavilion in park Hain, Bamberg

== See also ==
- Bamberg (potato) (named after the town)
- Bamberg Symphony Orchestra
- Rintfleisch-Pogrom
- Franconia
