= Coat of arms of the city of Bamberg =

Bamberg Free state of Bavaria
Emblazoning
In red a standing knight in silver armor with a red cross on his chest and a silver longsword at his belt; in his right hand a lance with a silver bannerette with a red cross on it; the left hand resting upon a blue shield with a silver eagle
Armiger:	Andreas Starke, Lord Mayor of Bamberg

The coat of arms of the city of Bamberg shows Saint George.

== Description of elements ==
Saint George is seen as the patron of the Cathedral chapter. He can be recognized by the St George's Cross upon his chest and the banner. It is said that the shield belongs to the noble family Andechs-Merania.

Saint George has two roles in this setting. He is charge for the coat of arms of the city of Bamberg and Supporter for the coat of arms of the counts of Andechs-Merania.

== History ==
First uses of the coat of arms in form of a seal are known since 1279. Across the years the charge changed: in the 14th century it was Heinrich II. Whereas in 15th and 16th century the "Bamberger Löwe" can be found, before again Saint George was used again. Also in the shield the eagle was replaced by a lion or the shield was missing completely.

== See also ==
- Coat of arms of Germany
- Coat of arms of Bavaria
