= Karl Adam Bader =

German cathedral organist and operatic tenor

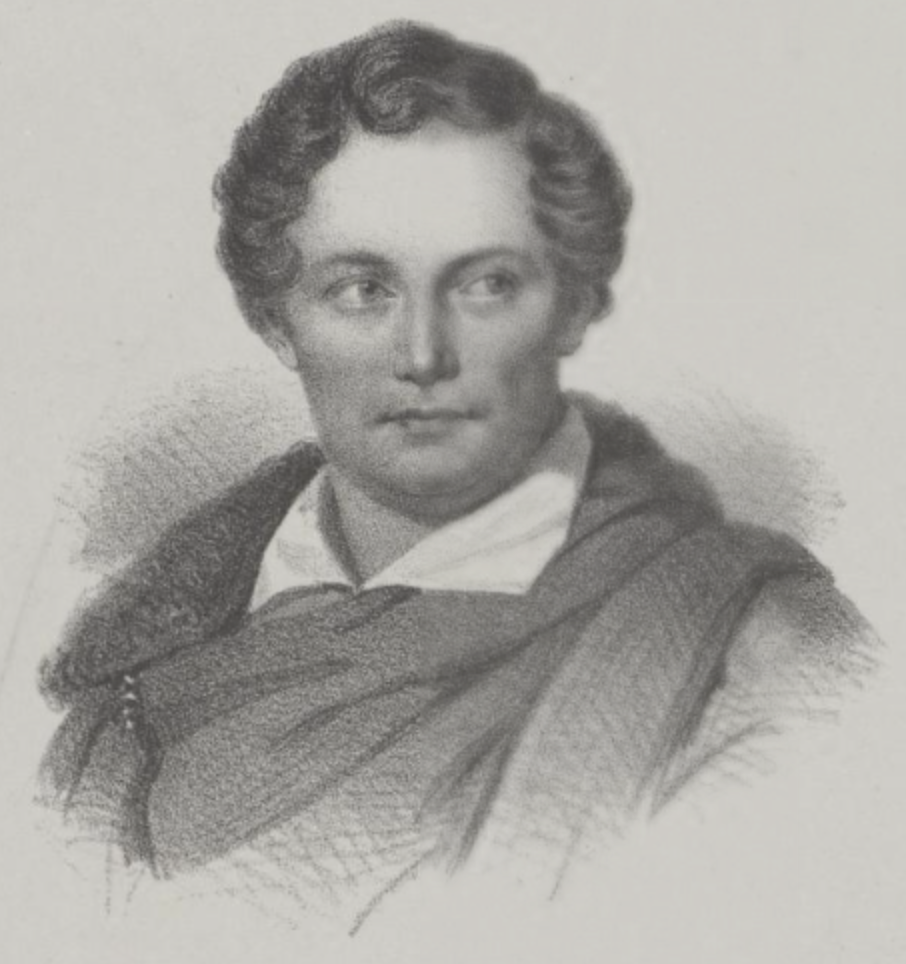
- Lithograph of Karl Adam Bader
- Born: 1789; Bamberg
- Died: 1870 (aged 80–81); Berlin
- Occupations: cathedral organist and operatic tenor

Karl Adam Bader, also known as Carl Adam Bader, was a German cathedral organist and Berlin Court Opera tenor. He was born in Bamberg in 1789 and died in Berlin in 1870.

== Biography ==
Bader was the son of a Bamberg organist, and his family encouraged his musical education. In 1807, he became the organist for the Bamberg Cathedral and became choirmaster there in 1809. In 1810, he debuted as a tenor at Bamberg. He worked in Munich from 1812 to 1816, and in October 1813, he married colleague Sophie Laurent. From December 1816 to July 1817, he worked at the Bremen Theater under directors Carl Gerber and Ringelhardt. He debuted again as a tenor on 30 May 1818 for Rossini's Tancredi in Brunswick and remained there until 1820. He became the opera director of the Berlin Court Opera in from 1844 to 1849. For the rest of his life, he remained the music director at St. Hedwig's Cathedral.
