= Drudenhaus (prison) =

Prison for witchcraft-accused people

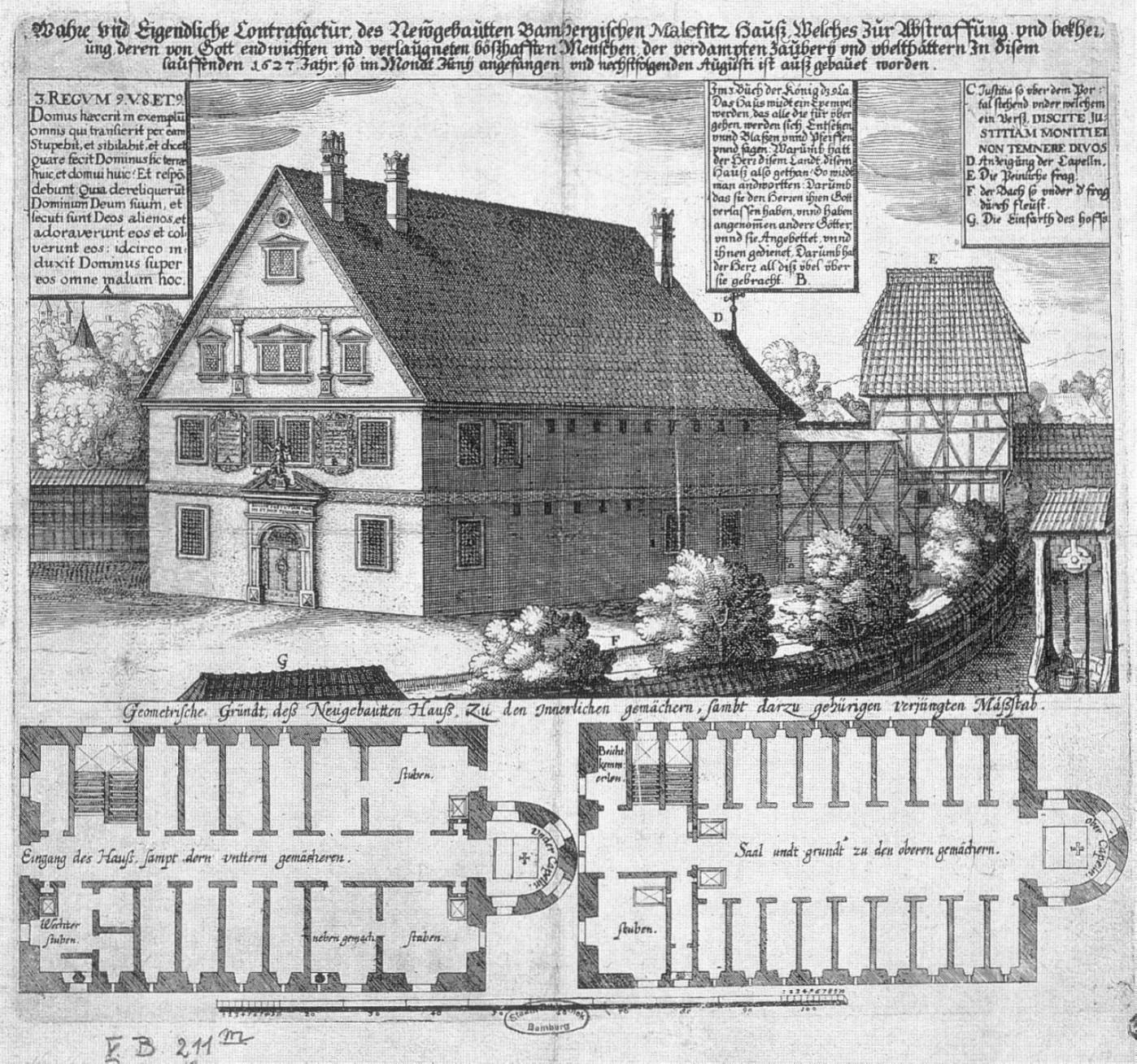
- Illustration and floor plan of the Drudenhaus
- Interactive map of Drudenhaus
- Location: Bamberg, Prince-Bishopric of Bamberg, Holy Roman Empire (now Germany); 49°53′36″N 10°53′28″E
- Security class: Special prison for people accused of witchcraft
- Population: 20 (April 1631)
- Opened: 1627
- Closed: 1632

The Drudenhaus (also known as Malefizhaus, Trudenhaus, Hexenhaus, and Hexengefängnis) was an infamous special prison for people accused during the Bamberg witch trials. The prison was constructed in 1627 on the order of Johann Georg Fuchs von Dornheim, Prince Bishop of Bamberg, and closed in 1632 as Swedish troops approached the city.

== History ==
The Bamberg Drudenhaus was not unique: smaller Drudenhäuser of the same kind were built also in Zeil am Main, Hallstadt and Kronach, but it was the biggest and most famous. The prison was constructed during the Bamberg witch trials, which began in 1626, and the Drudenhaus was used through the duration of the witch trials, which lasted until the closure of the prison.

The building contained 26 single cells, as well as two larger cells for groups of people. An inscription on the portal read: Discite justitiam moniti ET NON TEMNERE Divos (from Vergil's Aeneid: "Be warned, learn justice, and do not despise the gods"). Walls on the inside of the building were decorated with text from the Bible. People were placed in the Drudenhaus under the accusation of witchcraft and remained until their verdict. Torture was used inside the premises. In April 1631, 20 people were kept in the prison. During this time, about 300 people from the city of Bamberg and about 900 from the area were executed during the ongoing Bamberg witch trials, among them Johannes Junius, Georg Haan and Dorothea Flock.

On 11 February 1632, when the Swedish army marched toward Bamberg to take the city during the Thirty Years' War, officials closed the prison and released the prisoners of the Drudenhaus on condition that they agreed to keep silent about the torture inflicted upon them during their imprisonment.

The building itself was torn down in 1635.
