= Christina Morhaubt =

Victim of the Bamberg witch trials (died 1627)

Christina Morhaubt (née Merkhlein; died 4 August 1627, Zeil am Main) was a victim of the Bamberg witch trials.

She was married to the city Councillor and mayor of Bamberg, Johann Morhaubt and had two sons. After a bad harvest, which was rumored to be caused by magic, a witch panic erupted in Bamberg in 1626. Christina Morhaubt was arrested 9 April 1627. Her arrest developed into the arrest of people belonging to the city's upper classes, which brought in a considerable fortune in confiscated goods for the city government. She confessed under torture to have been converted to a witch by her mother, Dorl Greifin, eleven years earlier. Her confession resulted in the arrest of her maids, Kunigunth Weberin (who then named Christina's son Hans) and Ellin Helena von Kronach (who named the wives of mayor Georg Neudecker, mayor Johannes Junius, mayor Dietmeyer and councillor Georg Haan).

When her son, Hans (aged 14), was interrogated in June, he pointed out his younger brother Martin and several members of the Haan family as members of the witch coven. He was considered such an important witness that he was kept alive until January 1628, used to point out more people to be arrested and to give testimony against Georg Haan and his daughter. Christina Morhaubt was judged guilty as charged and burned alive on 4 August 1627 in Zeil am Main.

On 19 January 1628, the court sentenced Hans Morhaubt, along with Chancellor Georg Haan and his daughter, to death by fire. It is not known exactly when Hans was executed. He may have been imprisoned in Zeil until early April 1628.

As a result of the execution of such a number of prominent citizens of Bamberg, the Prince-Bishop and his officials confiscated over 500,000 guilders.

== Sources ==
- Britta Gehm, Die Hexenverfolgung im Hochstift Bamberg und das Eingreifen des Reichshofrates (RHR) zu ihrer Beendigung, Olms-Verlag, Hildesheim, 2000, S. 136–138; 2. Auflage 2011, ISBN 978-3-487-14731-4
