= Franz von Hatzfeld =

- Prince-Bishop of Würzburg
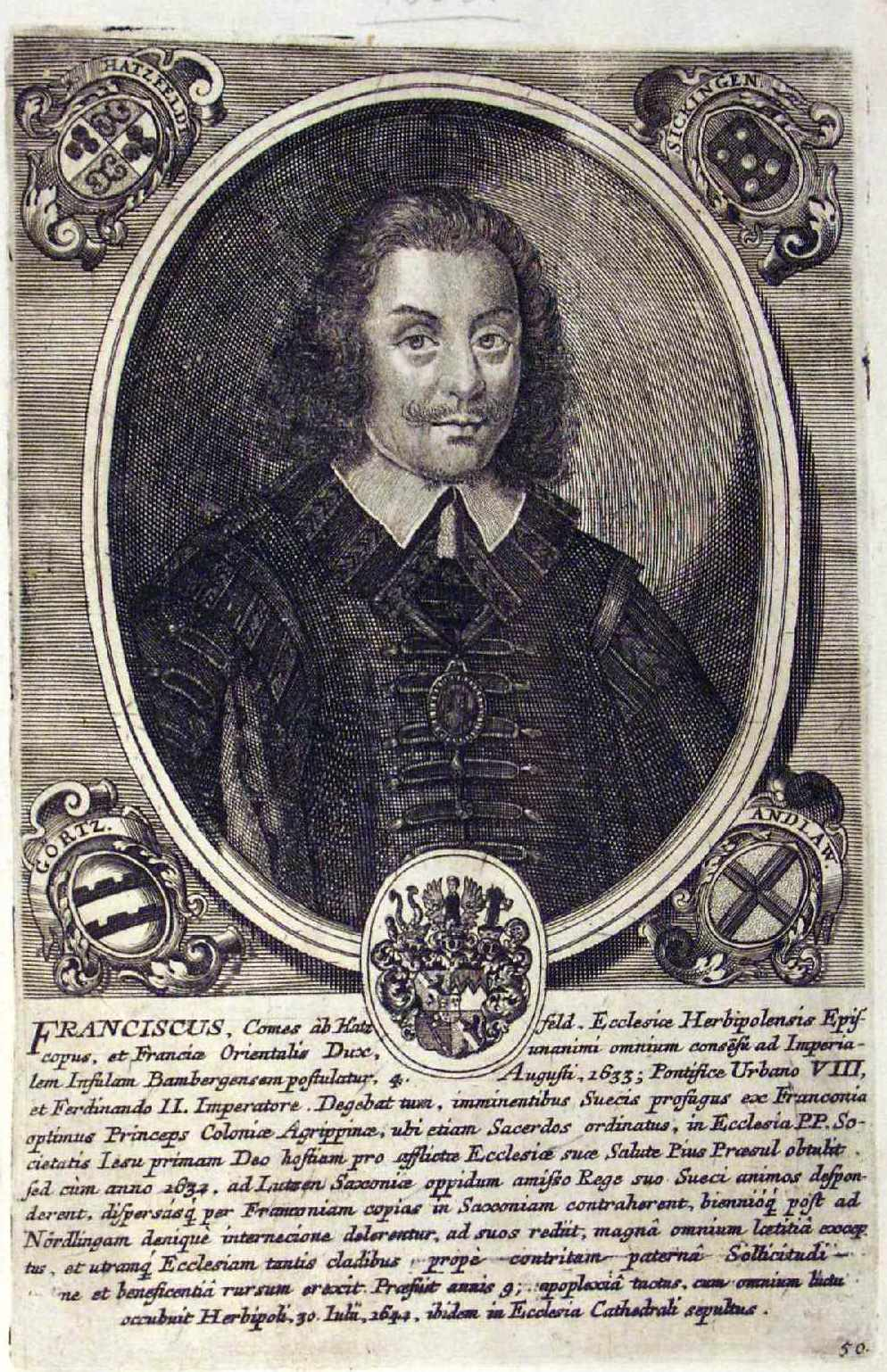
- Engraving of Franz von Hatzfeld by Johann Salver
- Church: Catholic Church
- Diocese: Diocese of Würzburg
- In office: 3 January 1632 – 30 July 1642
- Predecessor: Philipp Adolf von Ehrenberg
- Successor: Johann Philipp von Schönborn
- Other post: Bishop of Bamberg (1633-1642)

Orders
- Consecration: 12 April 1637 by Zacharias Stumpf

Personal details
- Born: 13 September 1596 Crottorf Castle (in present-day Friesenhagen), County of Nassau-Dillenburg, Lower Rhenish–Westphalian Circle, Holy Roman Empire
- Died: 30 July 1642 (aged 45) Würzburg, Prince-Bishopric of Würzburg, Franconian Circle, Holy Roman Empire

Franz von Hatzfeld (13 September 1596 – 30 July 1642) was the Prince-Bishop of Würzburg from 1631 to 1642 and the Prince-Bishop of Bamberg from 1633 to 1642.

Franz von Hatzfeld was born in Crottorf, near Friesenhagen, on 13 September 1596, the third son of Freiherr Sebastian von Hatzfeld-Wildenburg (1566-1631) and his wife Lucia von Sickingen (1569–1605), a granddaughter of Franz von Sickingen. His elder brother was Melchior von Hatzfeldt, Imperial field marshal. His father had been raised a Protestant, but converted to Roman Catholicism.

In 1615, he became a canon of Würzburg Cathedral and, two years later, of Bamberg Cathedral. At age thirty, he became head cantor of Bamberg Cathedral, and the next year, became diocesan administrator of Würzburg. He then served as provost of the Gangolfskirche in Bamberg.

The cathedral chapter of Würzburg Cathedral elected him Prince-Bishop of Würzburg on 7 August 1631, with Pope Urban VIII confirming his appointment on 3 January 1632.

With the Thirty Years' War raging, Swedish troops occupied the Prince-Bishopric of Bamberg and Franz von Hatzfeld fled to Cologne as a protective measure. On 20 June 1633 Lord High Chancellor of Sweden Axel Oxenstierna declared that the Prince-Bishopric of Bamberg and the Prince-Bishopric of Würzburg would henceforth be combined as the "Duchy of Franconia" and enfeoffed to Bernard of Saxe-Weimar.

On 4 August 1633 the cathedral chapter of Bamberg Cathedral (which had escaped to the Duchy of Carinthia) elected Franz von Hatzfeld Prince-Bishop of Bamberg, with Pope Urban VIII confirming this appointment on 31 October 1633. This created a personal union between the Prince-Bishopric of Würzburg and the Prince-Bishopric of Bamberg.

Following the Battle of Nördlingen of 5–6 September 1634, Franz von Hatzfeld ended his Cologne exile, returning to Würzburg in November 1634, accompanied by the troops of Philipp von Mansfeld.

He died of a stroke in Würzburg on 30 July 1642.

Catholic Church titles
Preceded by Philipp Adolf von Ehrenberg	Prince-Bishop of Würzburg; 1631–1642	Succeeded by Johann Philipp von Schönborn
Preceded by Johann Georg Fuchs von Dornheim	Prince-Bishop of Bamberg; 1633–1642	Succeeded by Melchior Otto von Voit von Salzburg
