= Bamberg witch trials =

Witch hunt in Germany from 1627 to 1632

Great Witch Hunt of Bamberg
- Timespan: 1623-32 (9 years)
- Location: Bamberg, Holy Roman Empire
- Number of Trials: est. 900-950
- Executions: 300-900+
- Notable Sources: Letter of Johannes Junius, Writings of Frederich Förner, Letter of Georg Wilhelm Dümler, Bamberg court records
- Notable Personalities: Prince-Bishops Johann Georg Fuchs von Dornheim & Johann Gottfried von Aschhausen, Frederich Förner
- Notable Victims: Johannes Junius, Dorothea Flock
- Occurred within the context of: Protestant Reformation & Counter Reformation, Thirty Years’ War, Economic Crisis
- Reasons for Ending: Arrival of the Swedish Army under Gustavus Adolphus and fleeing of von Dornheim, Intervention of Ferdinand II and the Pope, Decline in population to persecute

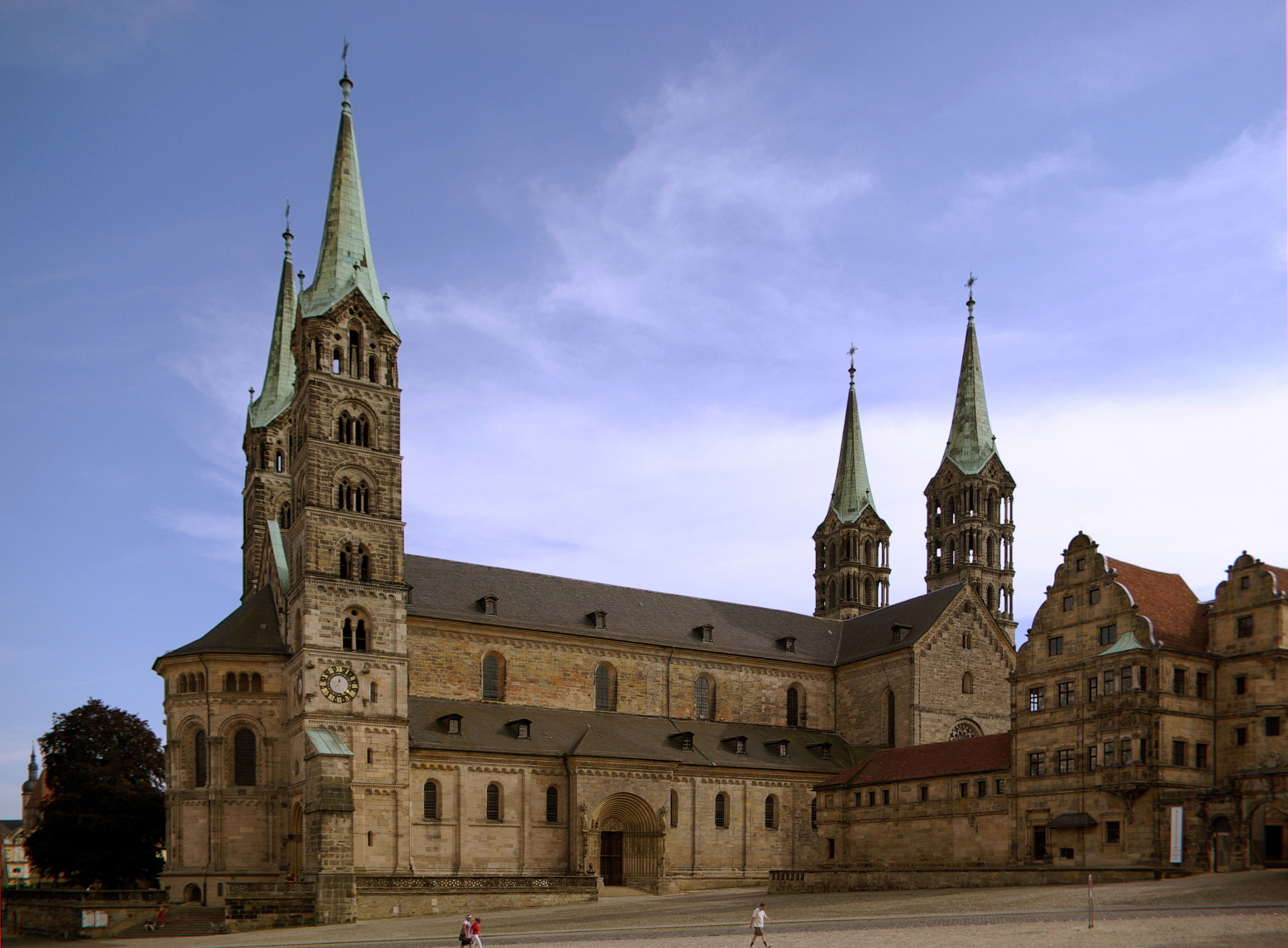
Bamberg Cathedral

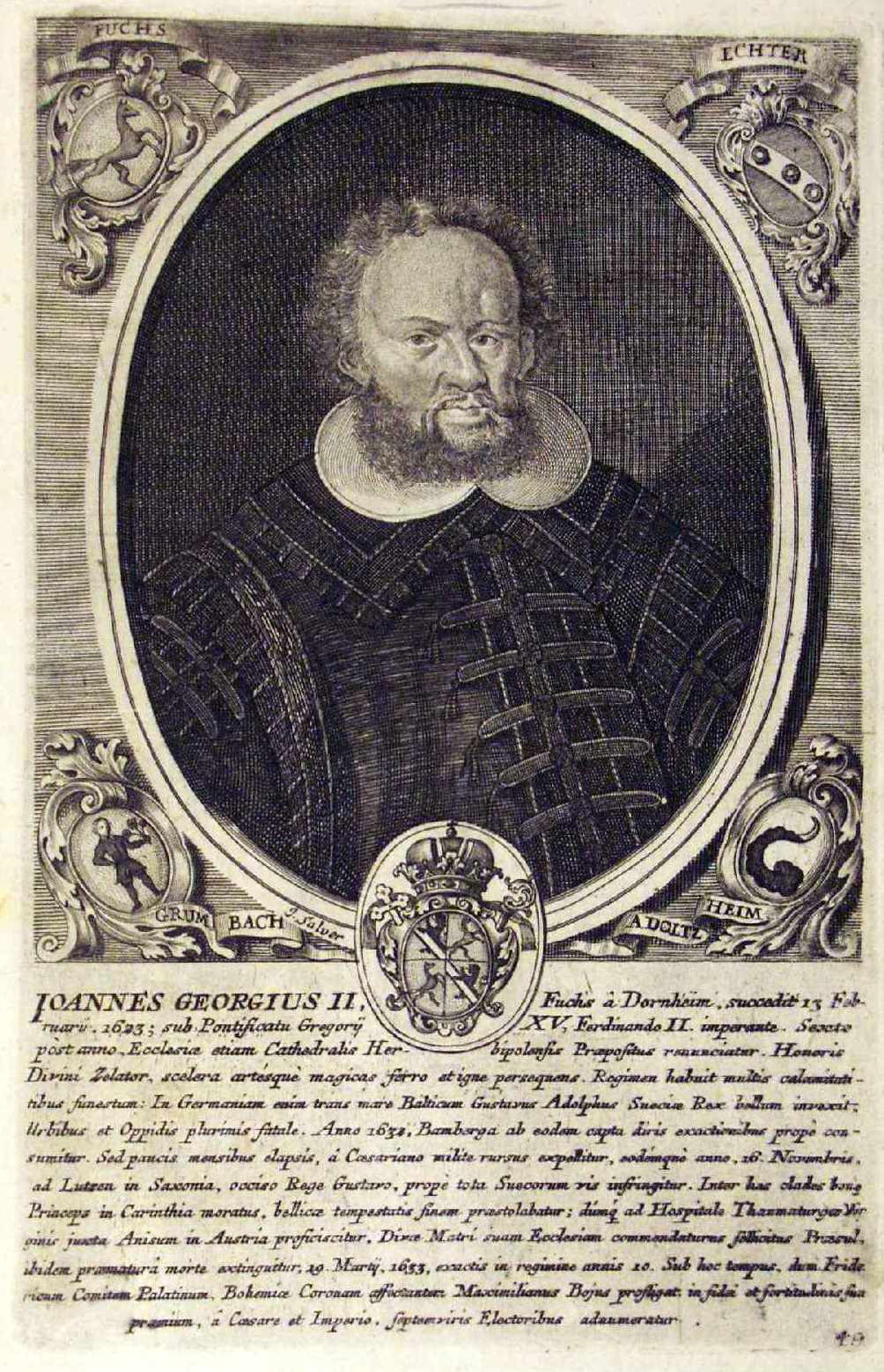
Engraving of Johann Georg Fuchs von Dornheim by Johann Salver.

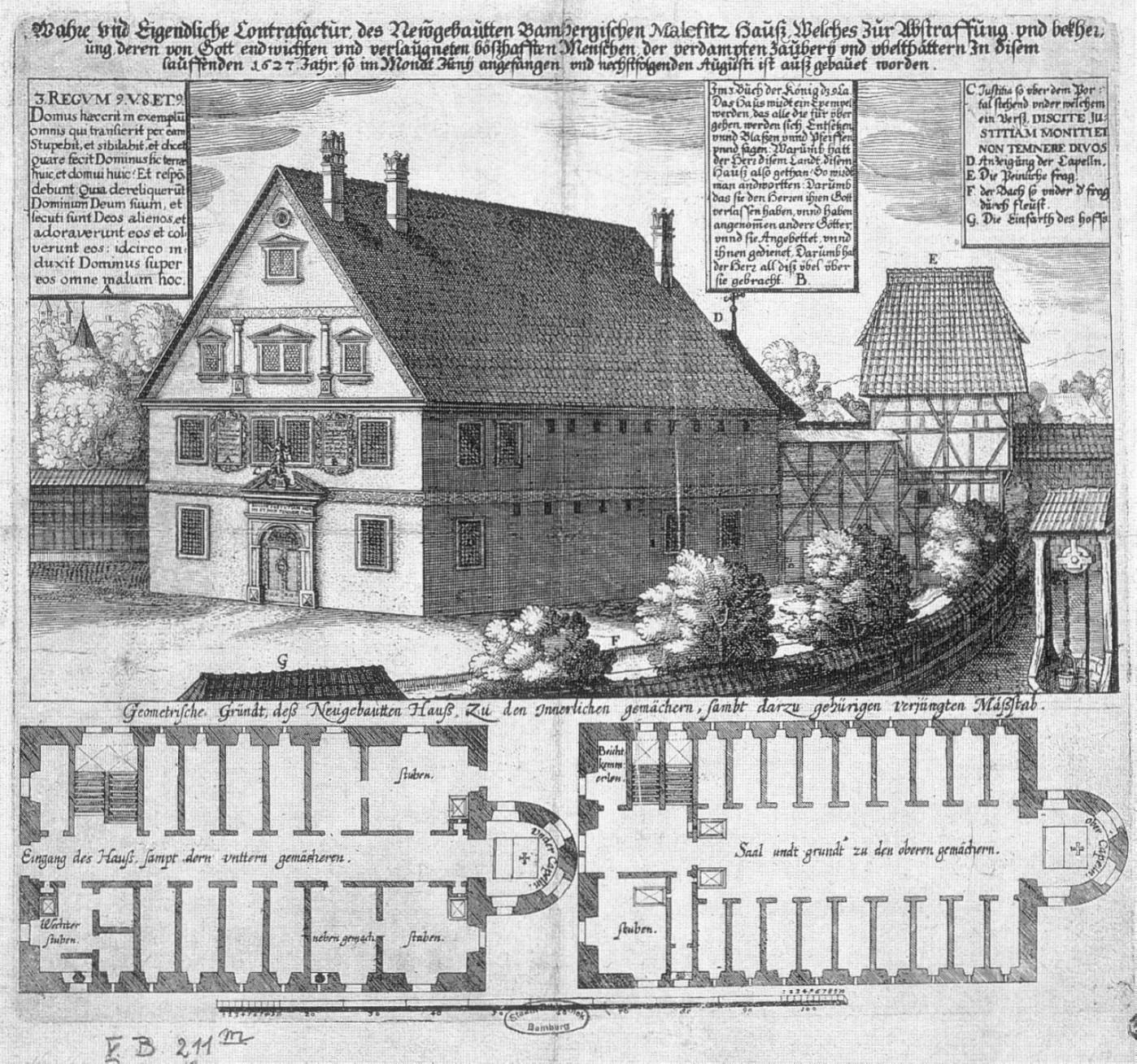
The Drudenhaus, Bamberg's prison for accused witches

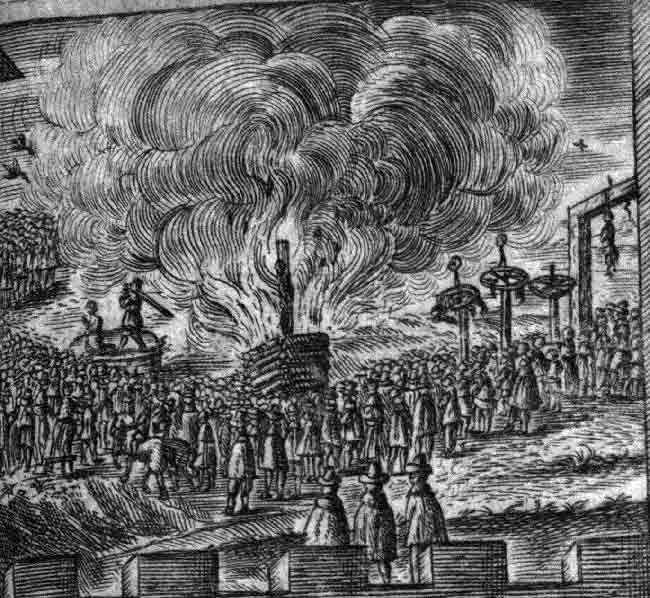
Witch burning

The Bamberg witch trials of 1627–1632, which took place in the self-governing Catholic Prince-Bishopric of Bamberg in the Holy Roman Empire in present-day Germany, was one of the biggest mass trials and mass executions ever seen in Europe, and one of the biggest witch trials in history. Over an extended period around 1,000 people were executed after being accused of witchcraft in Bamberg, about 900 of whom were executed in 1626–32.

The Bamberg witch trials were among the largest witch trials in the Early Modern period: it was one of the four largest witch trials in Germany alongside the Trier witch trials, the Fulda witch trials, and the contemporaneous Würzburg witch trials, all under the auspices of the reigning Prince-Bishops.

== Background ==
Prince-Bishop of Bamberg Neytard von Thüngen (died 1598) was the first to allow witch trials in his diocese. However, he was mostly occupied with fighting the Reformation. Under his successor, Johann Philipp von Gebsattel (died 1609), no one was executed for witchcraft. Only under Johann Gottfried von Aschhausen (died 1622), did prosecutions take off. Supported by the theologian Friedrich Förner, the bishop allowed a trial to go ahead that grew out of a family quarrel. In its course, several other people were charged with witchcraft and within one year 15 had been executed. A larger set of prosecutions came in 1616 following a series of crop failures. Through 1622, a total of 159 trials were registered, most resulting in deaths. The trials stopped in 1622, partially through the efforts of councillor Georg Haan, who successfully pointed out that the city funds were needed to protect the city during the Thirty Years' War.

== Witch trials of 1626-1632 ==
=== Outbreak ===
The Bamberg witch trials of 1626-1631 were initiated by the Reform Catholic and Counter-Reformation Catholic Prince Bishop Johann Georg Fuchs von Dornheim, Prince Bishop of Bamberg in 1623–1633. The territory was close to the Catholic-Protestant religious border, and the goal of the new Prince Bishop was to create a "Godly state" in accordance with the ideals of the Counter-Reformation, and to make the population obedient, devout and conformally Catholic. The Prince-Bishop was aided in this religious cleansing by his assisting Bishop, the theologian Friedrich Förner, whose theological work Panoplia Armaturae Dei was recommended in the sermons of Bamberg's churches. Förner portrayed the souls of humanity caught in the struggle between Good and Evil; he believed that Bamberg was not religiously pure, and that the public trusted folk healers such as "cunning women and little women-witches" more than the church.

The exact cause of the witch trials of 1626-1631 is not entirely clear due to incomplete documentation. In May 1626, frost destroyed the harvest in the entire region. Johann Langhans, Mayor of Zeil outside of Bamberg (who would himself later be executed), noted in his diary:

"the 27th of May [1626], the grapevines all over Franconia, in both Bishoprics [of] Bamberg and Würzburg, were destroyed by frost, as well as the dear corn, which had faded already... everywhere around Zeil, everything was destroyed by frost, which had never happened in people's memory, and caused substantial princes to rise...Whereupon an intense pleading and begging started among the common rabble [asking], why the authorities went on tolerating that the sorcerers and witches are damaging even the crops. Therefore, His Princely Highness [Johann Georg II] was alerted to punish such evil, and therefore the witch persecutions started this year."

Maria Anna Junius, a nun in a convent in Bamberg (whose father, Johannes Junius, would later be executed himself for witchcraft), wrote in her chronicle that: "a loud cry went up in the city...people where frighetened to death as they awoke to find that an unnatural night frost had killed off all the fruit trees, rendered the ground as hard as stone and put pain to the grain harvest. Our Prince [the Prince Bishop] was furious".

Citizens started to send petitions to the authorities demanding to know why witches and wizards had caused the frost, and the Prince Bishop issued an investigation. A local woman named Katharina Merckhlerin was arrested; in November 1626 she confessed to having caused the frost by use of witchcraft.

=== Legal process ===
A special Witch Commission was organized with the task of handling all cases of witchcraft and used special prosecutors, such as the famed doctor Schwarzkonz of Eichstätt. A ban was issued prohibiting all criticism of the trials by use of whipping and banishment. The Witch Commission used torture without any of the restrictions regulated by the Constitutio Criminalis Carolina.

The accused were tortured to confess maleficia (harmful magic); flying; participating in a Witches' Sabbath (in Bamberg often called "witches' dance"); sexual intercourse with Satan or with a lower ranked male or female demon; and having desecrated a sacred object. When the accused had confessed their own guilt, torture was applied to make them name their accomplices or other people they had seen attending the Witches' Sabbath. Those who had been named as accomplices were arrested in turn and tortured to name new accomplices, which caused the witch trial to expand rapidly in the number of arrests and executions, especially since the Witch Commission did not discriminate as to which names to accept but arrested men and women of all ages and classes indiscriminately. In 1627, the prisoners had reached such numbers that the Prince-Bishop constructed a special witch's prison, Malefizhaus or Drudenhaus, to house them all.

=== Cases and accused ===
Typical for both the Bamberg witch trials as well as the parallel witch trials in Würzburg, members of the elite were arrested after having been named by working-class people under torture, a phenomenon which would normally not have happened in early modern society had the process been about a different crime. Würzburg and Bamberg differed in that, in Würzburg, many members of the clerical elite were arrested, and a large number of children were among the accused, while Bamberg focused on secular adult elites. Many of the accused came from the class Bamberg officials and public servants, who would not normally have been arrested after having been accused by members of the working class.

The most famous cases during the Bamberg witch trials were those of the official Georg Haan and his wife Katharina, daughter Maria Ursula Haan, and son Adam Haan, who were all executed at the stake, and that of the official Johannes Junius, whose testimony of the torture he underwent become famous, was another, as was his wife. Georg Haan was in a difficult situation when the persecutions began in 1626, because he was known for his opposition to witch craft persecutions, having stopped the previous persecutions of 1622.

When the wife and daughter of Georg Haan were arrested in 1627, he left the city with his son Adam Haan and issued a complaint of the arrest of his wife and daughter to the Emperor, who ordered that the wife and daughter of Haan should be released. But when Georg and his son returned to Bamberg in 1628, his wife and daughter had already been executed after having named, under torture, George and Adam as their accomplices. Georg and Adam Haan were then arrested. The Emperor protested, but the ongoing Thirty Years' War made it practically difficult to conduct an intervention in Bamberg, and the Prince-Bishop ignored the Imperial orders.

One of the people Georg Haan named (under torture) as an accomplice was Johannes Junius, who garnered posthumous fame due to a letter he [Junius] wrote to his daughter Veronica from prison in June 1628 in which he declared his innocence but had been tortured to confess his guilt and name accomplices. The letter was smuggled out of prison and apparently successfully delivered. In May 1629, Barthol Braun, who had participated in the witch trials as a prosecutor, was himself arrested. His fate is not recorded.

The total number of executions is unknown as only some were documented. Of the confirmed numbers, 15 men and women were charged with witchcraft in the year 1626; 85 are noted for the year 1627, 137 for 1628, and 167 for 1629, which was the peak year of the witch trials, followed by 54 in 1630, and a lesser number in 1631, but these are only the confirmed cases and are not complete. All of the accused were executed by burning: sometimes the condemned could be decapitated beforehand, but the majority appear to have been burnt alive.

=== The end of the witch trials ===
The ongoing mass process in Bamberg attracted considerable attention. The fact that the Witch Commission accepted the names of accomplices given by accused witches under torture indiscriminately regardless of class, had resulted in many people arrested had influential relatives, family members and friends of the upper classes, with sufficient resources and knowledge to escape the territory and to issue complaints against the Prince Bishop and his witch trials to his superiors, such as the Holy Roman Emperor and the Pope.

A turning point was the case against Dorothea Flock, a member of a well-off merchant family from Nuremberg, whose spouse had fled to a colony of Bamberg refugees in Nuremberg and issued a complaint of her arrest to the Emperor. In April 1630, the Emperor called upon the Prince-Bishop to defend himself against the accusation made against him and to put an immediate stop to the case against Flock. The Prince-Bishop defied the Emperor and resumed the case on 28 April, which resulted in a new protest from the Emperor on 11 May. The Pope was asked to intervene.

An Imperial edict was issued by the Hofrat, but the witch hunters learned about its imminent delivery and executed Dorothea Flock on 17 May shortly before its arrival. The problem of the ongoing Bamberg witch trials was then placed on the agenda of the Imperial Diet of Regensburg on 20 September 1630. This caused outrage among the leadership of the Catholic church in Germany, who held the bishop responsible. An investigation by the Hofrat prevented any further trials from being launched. In parallel, Germany was devastated by the Swedish army under king Gustavus Adolphus of Sweden, who commented that he was willing to intervene against the witch trials of Bamberg.

In Bamberg, the assisting Bishop and theologian Friedrich Förner, who was a leading figure in the witch trials, died in 1630. Support among the population began to fade as people increasingly realized that everyone was at risk of ending up at the stake. Peasants refused to supply wood for the burnings. Under pressure, the Prince-Bishop stopped the Witch Commission from making new arrests. This did not mean, however, that ongoing trials were ended as those already arrested were still kept in prison.

In July 1631, the Emperor had Anton Winter, known for his opposition to witch hunts, appointed to become the new head of the Prince-Bishop's Witch Commission in Bamberg. When Anton Winter arrived in Bamberg, the Prince-Bishop fled the city. The bishop fled to Austria. The Witch Commission under Anton Winter released all the prisoners of the witch prison. They ended for good when the Protestant Swedish troops approached Bamberg in 1632.

== Legacy and aftermath ==
Several smaller witch trials followed until the last one in 1680. By that time, a total of around 1,000 people had been killed in the Prince-Bishopric of Bamberg. In contemporary Germany, the gigantic, parallel mass witch trials of Würzburg and Bamberg were seen as role models by other Catholic states and cities interested in investigating witchcraft, notably Wertheim and Mergentheim.

== Sources ==
- Rapley, Robert (2007). Witch Hunts: From Salem to Guantanamo Bay. McGill-Queen's University Press. ISBN 978-0-7735-3186-4. JSTOR j.ctt819pr.
- Hugh Trevor-Roper: The Crisis of the Seventeenth Century. The European Witch-craze of the Sixteenth and Seventeenth Centuries (1967)
- "The European Witch-craze of the Sixteenth and Seventeenth Centuries".
