= Georg Mengel =

German composer

Georg Mengel (1612 in Bamberg – 1667) was a German composer. After service in the army from 1640 he was Kapellmeister to Fürstbischof Melchior Otto Voit von Salzburg at the court of the Prince-Bishopric of Bamberg.

== Works ==
- Quinque limpidissimi lapides Davidici cum funda, seu Psalmi 51 cum Motetta centuplici varietate. 1644
