= Neytard von Thüngen =

Prince-Bishop of Bamberg from 1591 to 1598

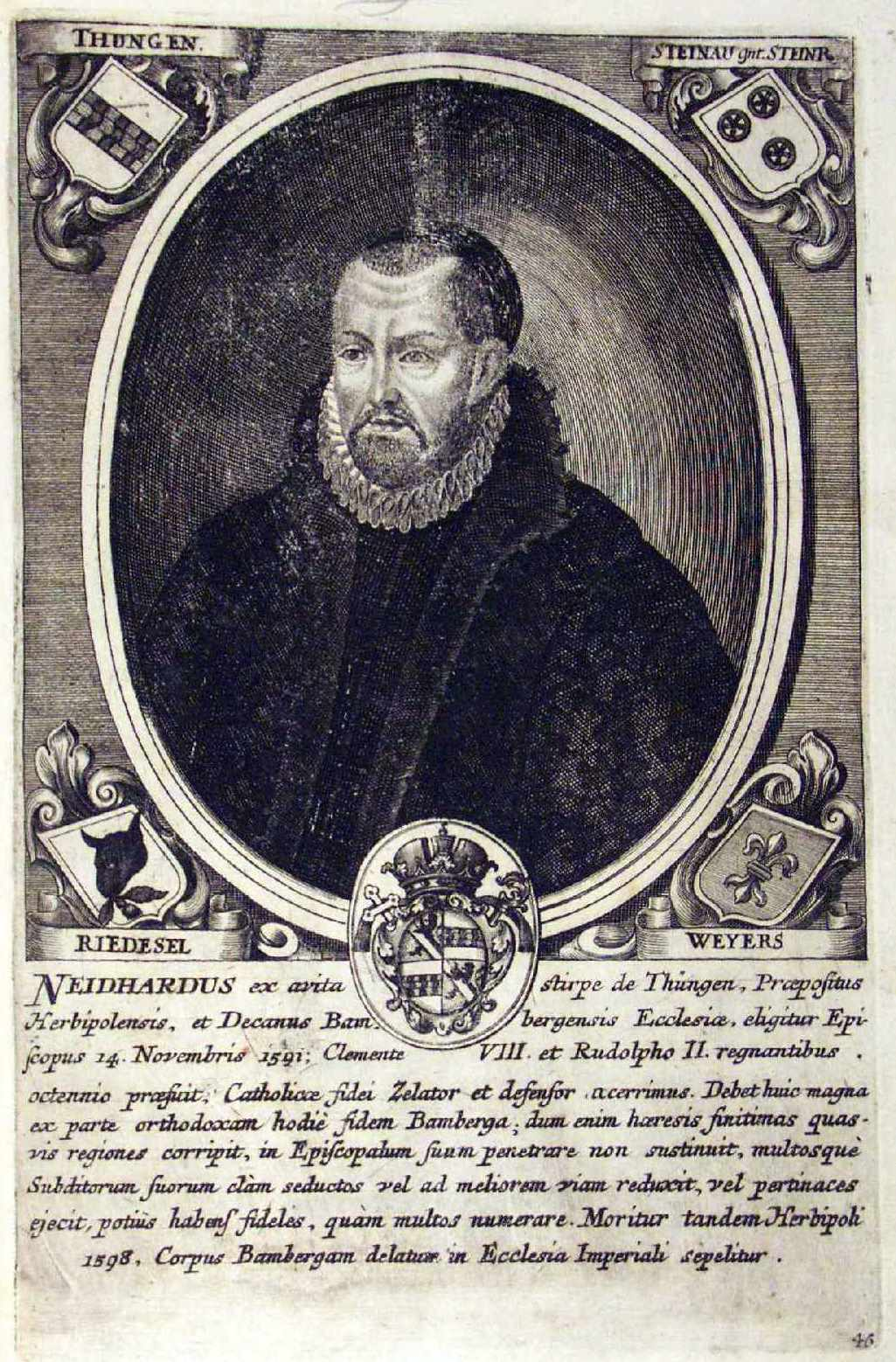
Engraving of Neytard von Thüngen by Johann Salver.

Neytard von Thüngen (1 May 1545 – 26 December 1598) was the Prince-Bishop of Bamberg from 1591 to 1598.

== Biography ==
Neytard von Thüngen was born in Wüstensachsen (today a district of Ehrenberg, Hesse) on 1 May 1545.

He was elected Prince-Bishop of Bamberg on December 14, 1591, and Pope Clement VIII confirmed his appointment on 6 June 1593. He was ordained as a priest in 1596. Johann Ertlin, auxiliary bishop of Bamberg, consecrated him as a bishop on 11 November 1597. He was a leading proponent of the Counter-Reformation. The witch-hunt in Bamberg began while he was prince-bishop.

He died in Würzburg on 26 December 1598, and is buried in Michaelsberg Abbey, Bamberg.

Catholic Church titles
Preceded by Ernst von Mengersdorf	Prince-Bishop of Bamberg; 1591–1598	Succeeded by Johann Philipp von Gebsattel
