= Johann Gottfried von Aschhausen =

Roman Prince-Bishop who conducted witch trials (1575–1622)

- Prince-Bishop of Bamberg
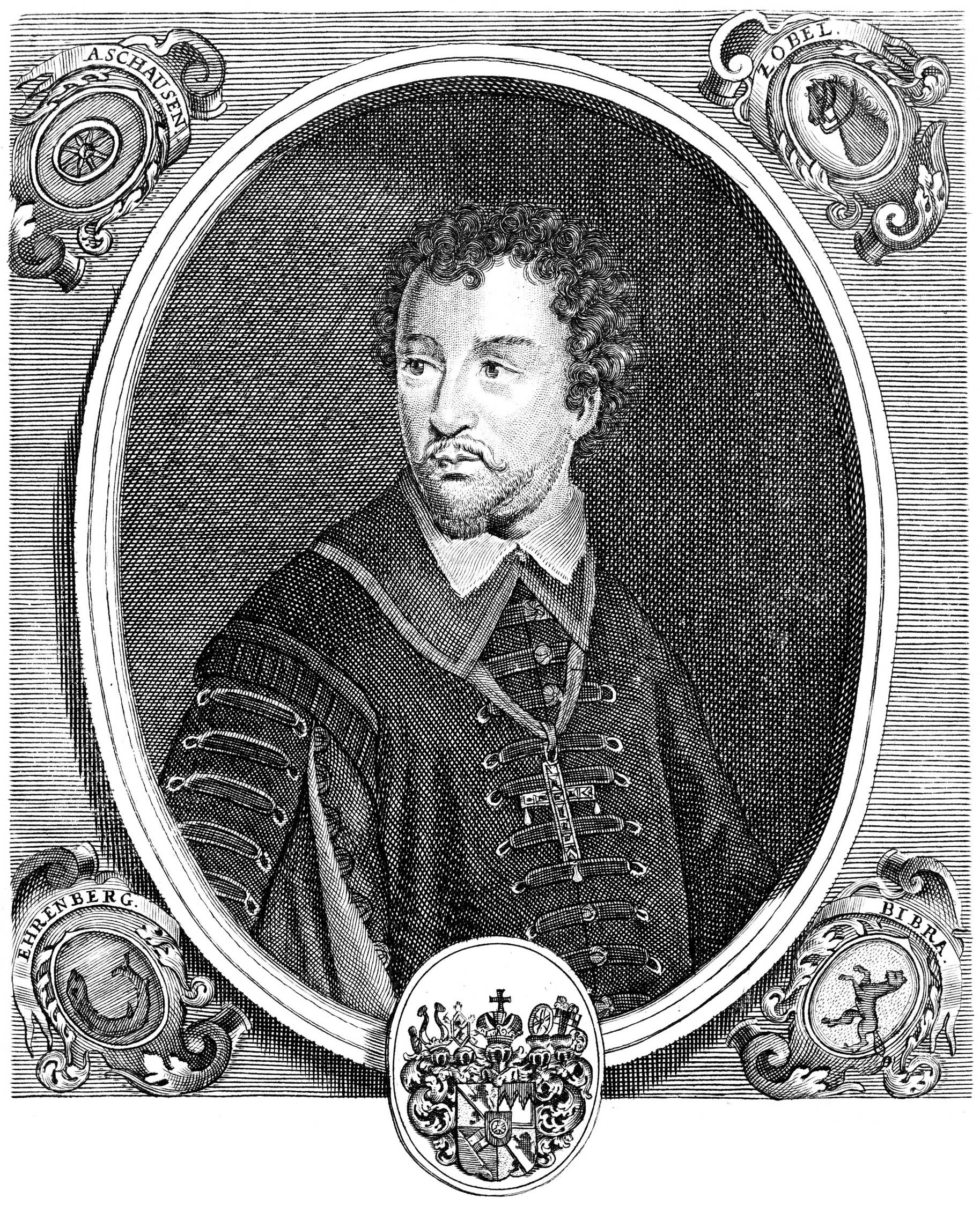
- Engraving of Johann Gottfried von Aschhausen by Johann Salver
- Church: Catholic Church
- Diocese: Diocese of Bamberg
- In office: 4 November 1609 – 29 December 1622
- Predecessor: Johann Philipp von Gebsattel
- Successor: Johann Georg Fuchs von Dornheim
- Other post: Bishop of Würzburg (1618-1622)

Orders
- Ordination: 22 December 1601
- Consecration: 2 February 1610 by Wolfgang von Hausen

Personal details
- Born: 12 August 1575 Oberlauda (in present-day Lauda-Königshofen), Prince-Bishopric of Würzburg, Franconian Circle, Holy Roman Empire
- Died: 29 December 1622 (aged 47) Regensburg, Prince-Bishopric of Regensburg, Bavarian Circle, Holy Roman Empire

Johann Gottfried von Aschhausen (12 August 1575 – 29 December 1622) was the Prince-Bishop of Bamberg from 1609 to 1622 and Prince-Bishop of Würzburg from 1617 to 1622.

Johann Gottfried von Aschhausen was born in Oberlauda, today a district of Lauda-Königshofen, on 12 August 1575. He became a canon of Bamberg Cathedral in 1593, upon the resignation of an older brother. He was ordained as a priest on 22 December 1601. He became the dean of Comburg in 1604. He played a role in the formation of the Catholic League, under the leadership of Maximilian I, Elector of Bavaria, on 10 July 1609.

He was elected Prince-Bishop of Bamberg on 21 July 1609, with Pope Paul V confirming the appointment on 4 November 1609. He was consecrated as a bishop by Wolfgang von Hausen, Prince-Bishop of Regensburg, on 2 February 1610. As Prince-Bishop of Bamberg, he sought to curb the growth of Protestantism in the Prince-Bishopric of Bamberg, inviting the Jesuits to assume an important role in education in Bamberg. He conducted a witch-hunt in the Prince-Bishopric of Bamberg in 1612–13 and again in 1617–18, which saw approximately 300 accused witches burnt at the stake in this period.

He was elected Prince-Bishop of Würzburg on 5 October 1617, with Pope Paul V confirming the appointment on 10 February 1618. This created a personal union between the Prince-Bishopric of Bamberg and the Prince-Bishopric of Würzburg. During the Thirty Years' War, Bamberg and Würzburg deployed large numbers of infantry and cavalry in 1620 and 1622.

He died in Regensburg on 29 December 1622 and is buried in Bamberg Cathedral.

Catholic Church titles
Preceded by Johann Philipp von Gebsattel	Prince-Bishop of Bamberg; 1609–1622	Succeeded by Johann Georg Fuchs von Dornheim
Preceded by Julius Echter von Mespelbrunn	Prince-Bishop of Würzburg; 1617–1622	Succeeded by Philipp Adolf von Ehrenberg
