= Giechburg =

Partly reconstructed hilltop castle in Upper Franconia, Bavaria, Germany

Coordinates: 49°57′18″N 11°02′58″E

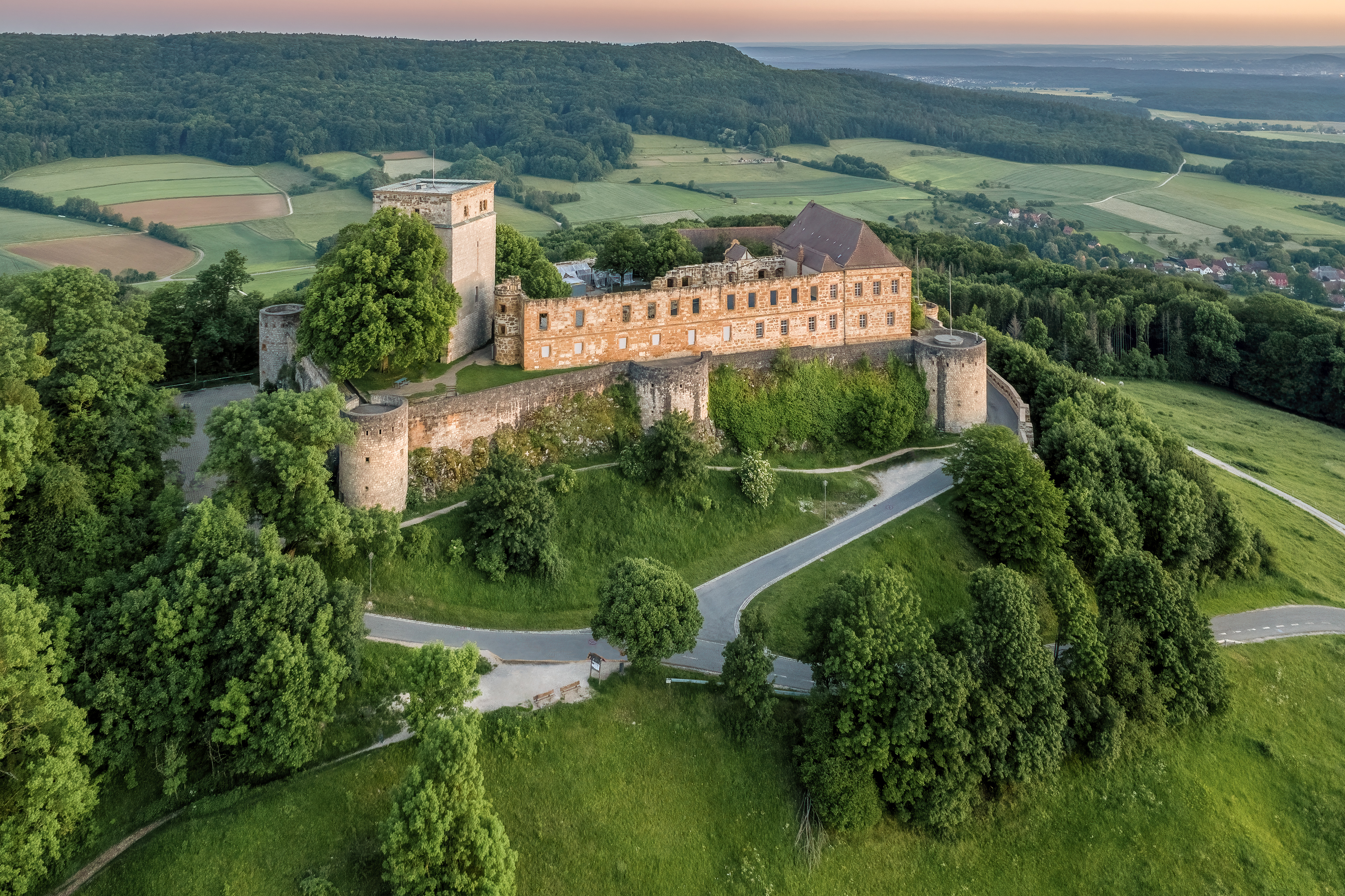
Aerial view of Giechburg in June 2021

The Giechburg is a partly reconstructed hilltop castle near the town of Scheßlitz in Upper Franconia, Bavaria, Germany. The castle has given its name to a constituent community within the town.

== History ==
Archeological evidence indicates that this hilltop was fortified as far back as Neolithic times. The castle enters written history in 1125, and its possession thereafter is marked by a succession of wills and bequest documents, punctuated by at least one forcible transfer in 1142. The castle entered the possession of the prince-bishops of Bamberg in 1390, and its history thereafter is closely allied to the bishopric and the city of Bamberg. The castle was destroyed and rebuilt several times over the subsequent centuries, first in 1430, during a period of disorder associated with the Hussites in nearby Bohemia, then in 1525 amid the German Peasants' War, and again in 1553 during the Second Margrave War.

The castle was rebuilt between 1599 and 1609, but was became less useful to the prince-bishops over the centuries and eventually fell into ruin. As gunpowder warfare matured, the Giechburg was no longer useful as a strongpoint. It was adaptively reused by the prince-bishops, especially Johann Philipp von Gebsattel, as a hunting lodge and by later prince-bishops as the headquarters of a horse farm. However, with secularization in 1802, the Giechburg no longer had an owner with an interest in maintenance and upkeep. The former castle was used as a quarry for dressed stone, and became a ruin.

The Giechburg was acquired by Hermann von Giech in the 19th century, remaining in that family until 1932. It was acquired by the district of Bamberg in 1971, and was reconstructed as a conference and hospitality centre. Signage describes the history of the castle and the topography of Upper Franconia.
