= Heinrich Pfendner =

Bavarian organist and composer

Heinrich Pfendner (c. 1590 in Hollfeld Oberfranken – 1630 in Würzburg) was a Bavarian organist and composer. A native of Franconia, Pfendner was in the service of Johann Jakob von Lamberg, Bishop of Gurk (Austria) by 1614, and joined the chapel of Archduke Ferdinand of Austria at Graz by 1615. By 1618 Pfendner was court organist in Würzburg for Johann Gottfried von Aschhausen, who was simultaneously Prince-Bishop of Würzburg and Bamberg. He then served his successor, Philipp Adolph von Ehrenberg of Würzburg, until his death in 1630. Pfendner was one of the first South German composers to have experimented with the new Italian concerted style in his church compositions. His extant works include four printed books of motets, an eight-voice setting of Psalm 50 (1645), two organ canzonas, and a handful of motets printed in contemporary anthologies.

== Works ==
- Delli Motetti a due, tre, quatro, cinque, sei, sette et otto voci (Graz, 1614)
- Motectorum binis, ternis, quaternis, senis, octonisque vocibus concinendorum. Liber secundus. Cum Basso ad Organum (Würzburg, 1623)
- Motectorum binis, ternis, quaternis, quinis, senis, septenis, octonisque vocibus concinendorum, liber tertius, cum basso ad organum (Würzburg, 1625)
- Motectorum, singulis, binis, ternis, quaternis, quinis, senis, septenis, octonisque vocibus concinendorum. Liber quartus. Cum Basso ad Organum (Würzburg, 1630)
- Regis Hebronensis Psalmus Quinquagesimus, octies octonisque vocibus concertatus; atque amarissimae passioni Jesu Christi Domini ac Salvatori nostri, supplex decantandus (Würzburg, 1645)
