= Prince-Bishopric of Bamberg =

Ecclesiastical State of the Holy Roman Empire

Prince-Bishopric of Bamberg Hochstift Bamberg (German)
- 1245–1802
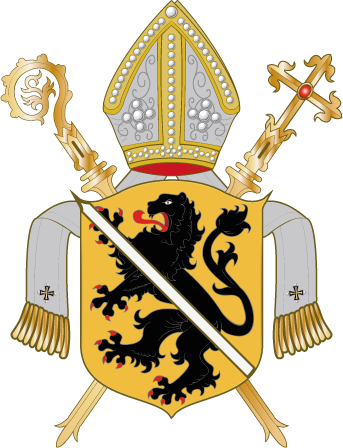
- Coat of arms

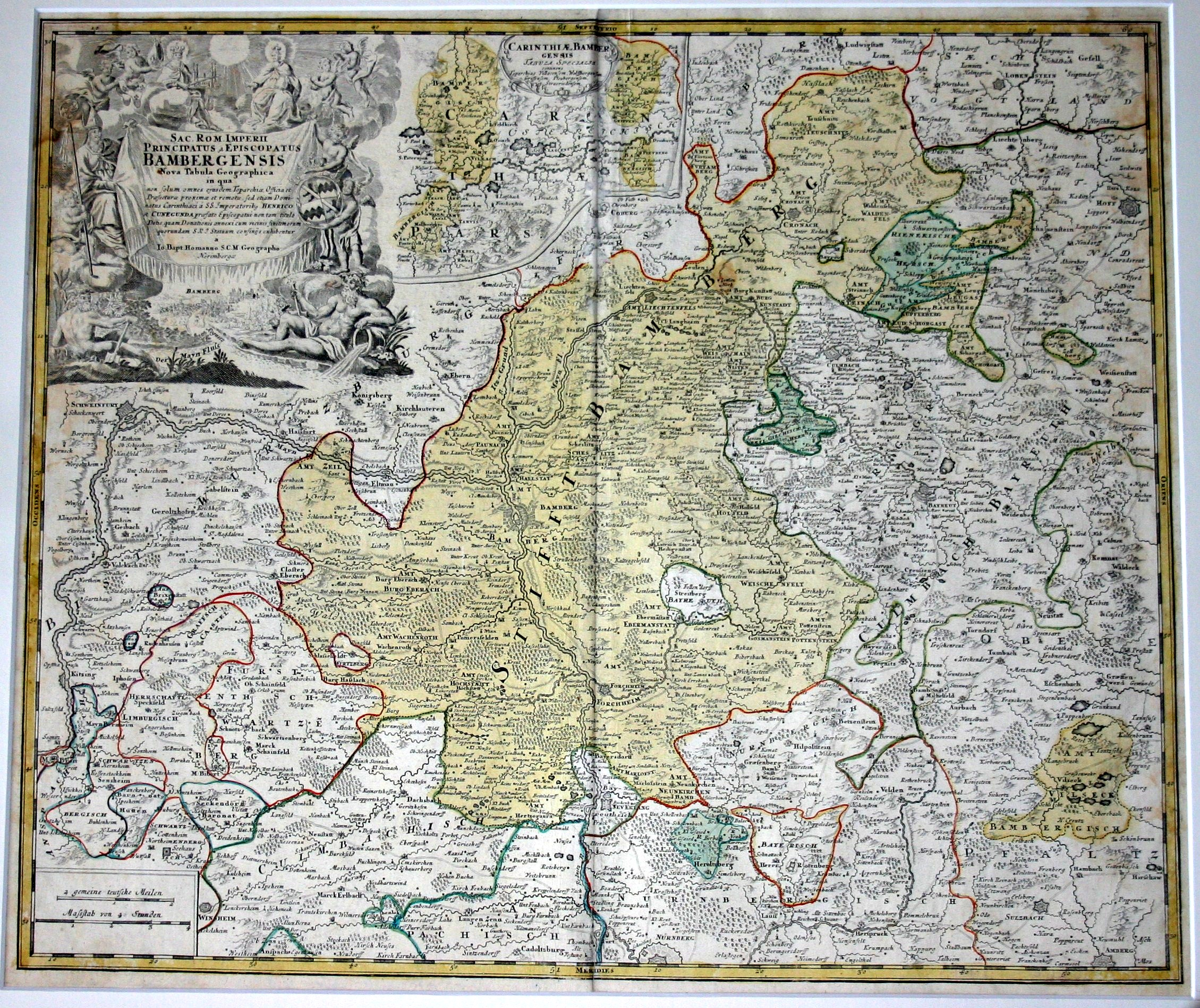
- Hochstift Bamberg with its Carinthian estates, J.B. Homann, c.1700
- Status: Prince-Bishopric
- Capital: Bamberg; 50°1′52″N 10°57′12″E
- Common languages: East Franconian
- Historical era: Middle Ages
  - Diocese established: 1007
  - Elevated to Prince-bishopric: 1245
  - Joined Franconian Circle: 1500
  - Mediatised to Bavaria: 1802
Preceded by	Succeeded by
Duchy of Franconia	Electorate of Bavaria

The Prince-Bishopric of Bamberg (German: Hochstift Bamberg) was an ecclesiastical State of the Holy Roman Empire. It goes back to the Roman Catholic Diocese of Bamberg established at the 1007 synod in Frankfurt, at the behest of King Henry II to further expand the spread of Christianity in the Franconian lands. The bishops obtained the status of Imperial immediacy about 1245 and ruled their estates as Prince-bishops until they were subsumed to the Electorate of Bavaria in the course of the German Mediatisation in 1802.

== State ==
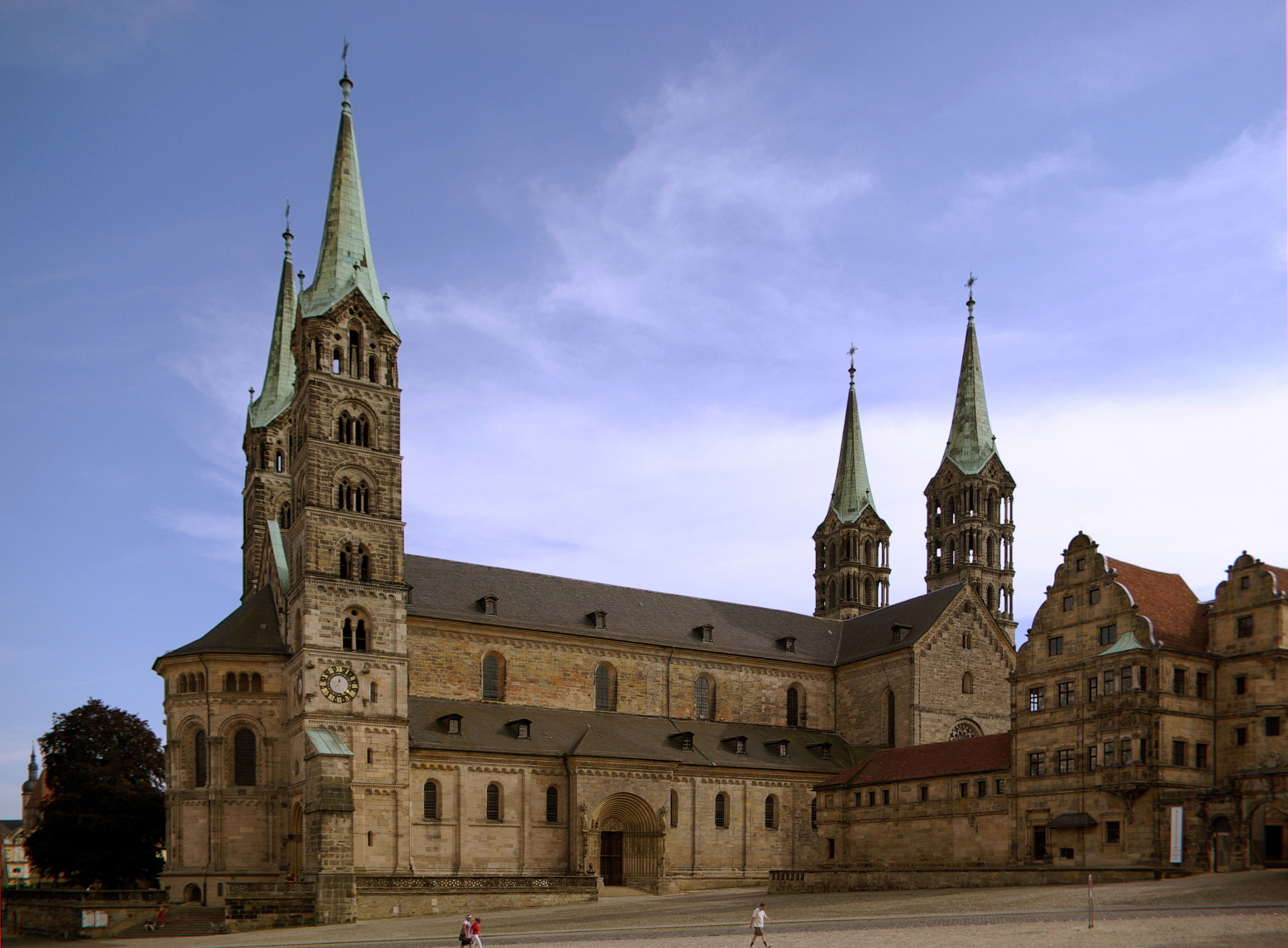
Bamberg Cathedral

The Bishops of Bamberg received the princely title by Emperor Frederick II of Hohenstaufen before his deposition by Pope Innocent IV in 1245, whereby the diocese became an Imperial state, covering large parts of the current Bavarian region of Franconia ("Main Franconia").

Part of the Franconian Circle (territories grouped together within the Holy Roman Empire for defensive purposes) from 1500 onwards, the Bamberg territory was bordered, among others, by the Prince-Bishopric of Würzburg to the west, by the Hohenzollern margraviate of Brandenburg-Ansbach and the Free Imperial City of Nuremberg to the south, by the margraviate of Brandenburg-Bayreuth to the east and by the Wettin duchy of Saxe-Coburg to the north. During the 18th century, it was often held in conjunction with the neighbouring Diocese of Würzburg, whose rulers since 1168 claimed the archaic title of a "Duke of Franconia".

The Prince-bishopric was also vested with large possessions within the Duchy of Carinthia that were strategically important for crossing the Eastern Alps, including the towns of Villach, Feldkirchen, Wolfsberg and Tarvis, located at the trade route to Venice, as well as Kirchdorf an der Krems in the Archduchy of Austria. The Habsburg Empress Maria Theresa purchased these territories in 1759.

In the course of the German Mediatisation of 1802/3 which saw the suppression of virtually all the ecclesiastical principalities, Bamberg was annexed to Bavaria. The former prince-bishopric then had an area of 3,580 km^{2} and a population of 207,000.

== History ==
=== Establishment ===
Beginning on 1 November 1007, a synod was held in the city of Frankfurt am Main. Eight archbishops and twenty-seven bishops were present, led by Archbishop Willigis of Mainz, as well as the Ottonian ruler Henry II, elected King of the Romans in 1002. The king, having suppressed the revolt of Margrave Henry of Schweinfurt in 1003, intended to strengthen his rule and to create a new diocese that would aid in the final conquest of paganism in the Franconian area around Bamberg. Nevertheless, as the territory of the Wends on the upper Main, Wiesent, and Aisch rivers had belonged to the dioceses of Würzburg since the organization of the Middle German bishoprics by St. Boniface, the new bishopric could not be erected without the consent of the occupant of that see. Bishop Henry I of Würzburg was willing to go along with parting with some of his territory, as the king promised to have Würzburg raised to an archbishopric and to give him an equivalent in Meiningen. The consent of Pope John XVII was obtained for this arrangement, however, the elevation of Würzburg to an archbishopric proved impracticable also due to Willigis' reservations, and Bishop Henry I at first withdrew his consent.

Nevertheless, after several further concessions, King Henry II obtained the consent for the foundation of the diocese of Bamberg from parts of the dioceses of Würzburg and - later - the Diocese of Eichstätt. Bamberg first was made exempt, i.e. directly subordinate to Rome. It was also decided that Eberhard, the king's chancellor, would be ordained by Archbishop Willigis of Mainz, to be the head of the new border area diocese. The new diocese had expensive gifts at the synod confirmed by documents, in order to place it on a solid foundation.

Henry wanted the celebrated monkish rigour and studiousness of the Hildesheim cathedral chapter - Henry himself was educated there—linked together with the churches under his control, including his favourite bishopric of Bamberg. The next seven bishops were appointed by the Holy Roman Emperors, after which election by the cathedral chapter became the rule, as in all the German prince-bishoprics. Eberhard's immediate successor, Suidger of Morsleben, became pope in 1046 as Pope Clement II. He was the only pope to be interred north of the Alps at the Bamberg Cathedral. Bishop Hermann I oversaw the foundation of Banz Abbey in 1070; Bishop Otto of Bamberg (d. 1139) became known as the "Apostle of the Pomeranians".

=== Imperial state ===
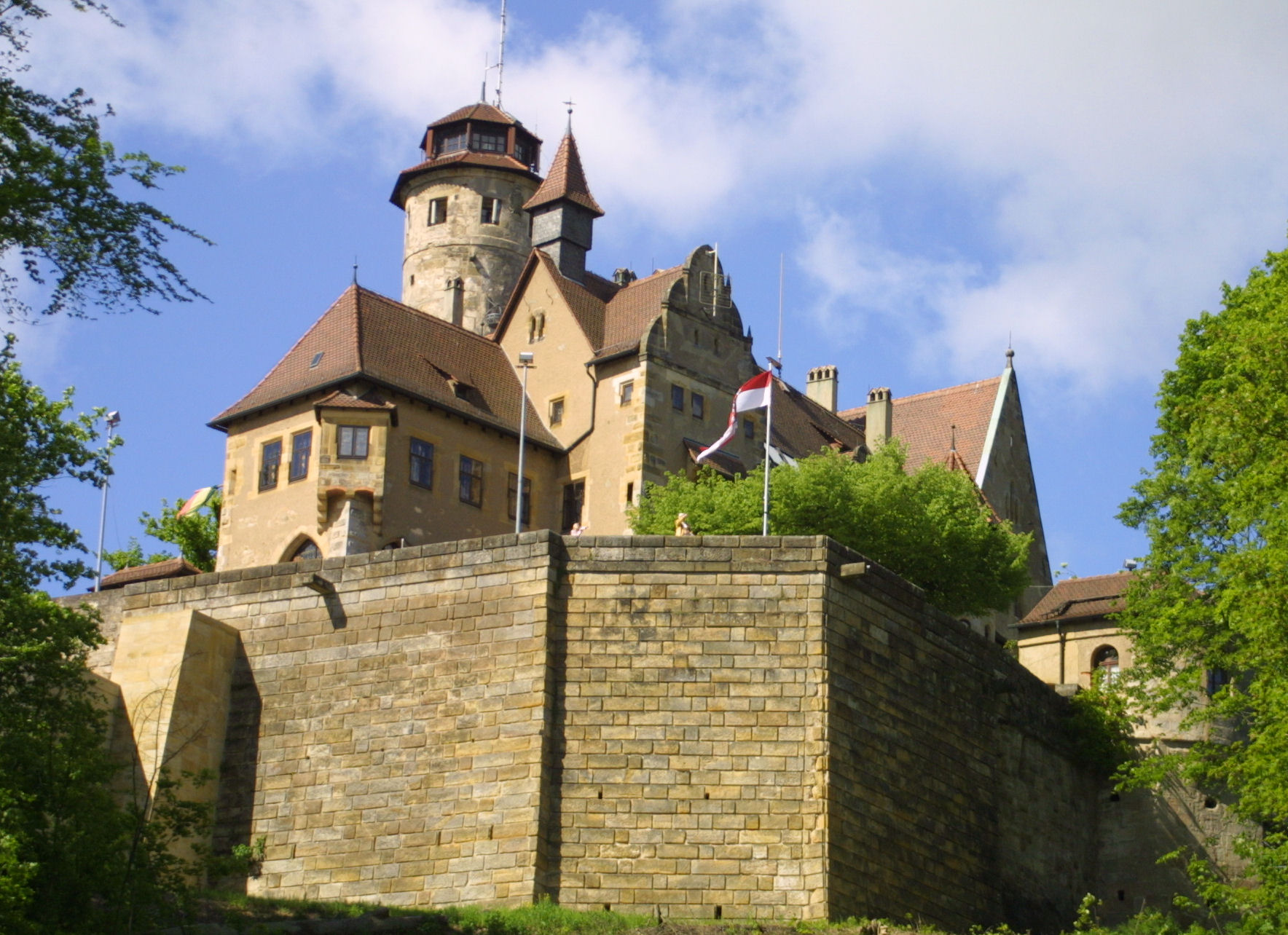
Altenburg, residence of the Bamberg prince-bishops from 1305 to 1553

In the early 13th century, the Bamberg bishops interfered in the German throne dispute between the Welf and Hohenstaufen dynasties: Bishop Ekbert of Andechs, son of Duke Berthold of Merania, was faced with the suspicion of being involved in the murder of Philip of Swabia in 1208 and temporarily had to flee to the Hungarian court of his brother-in-law King Andrew II. His relative Poppo, bishop from 1238, was deposed by the Hohenstaufen emperor Frederick II in 1242.

Emperor Frederick II appointed a local supporter, the Bamberg canon Henry of Bilversheim, bishop. Bishop Henry became the first Prince-bishop; under his rule, the diocese gradually became a territorial principality, and its bishops took secular precedence next after the Mainz archbishops From about 1305, Altenburg Castle was used as a secondary residence. In 1390 Bishop Lamprecht, former chancellor of Emperor Charles V, also acquired the fortress of Giechburg. The early 15th century saw fierce conflicts with Hussite rebels as well as with the Bamberg citizens. Bishop Heinrich Groß von Trockau (d. 1501) entered into several fights with the Hohenzollern prince Casimir of Brandenburg-Bayreuth.

=== Protestant Reformation ===
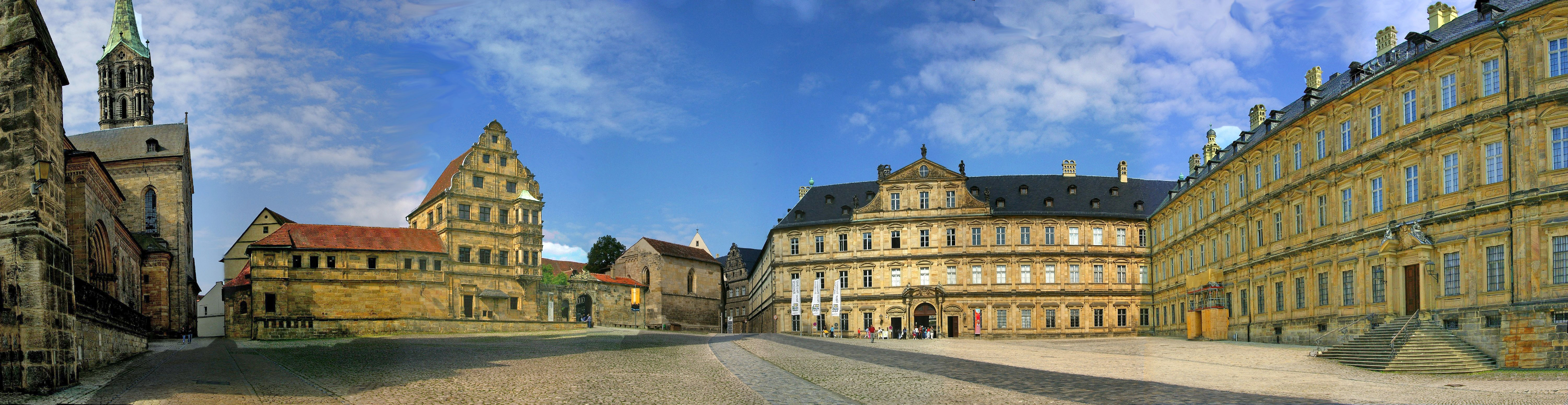
Bamberg Cathedral with the old and new palaces of the prince-bishops

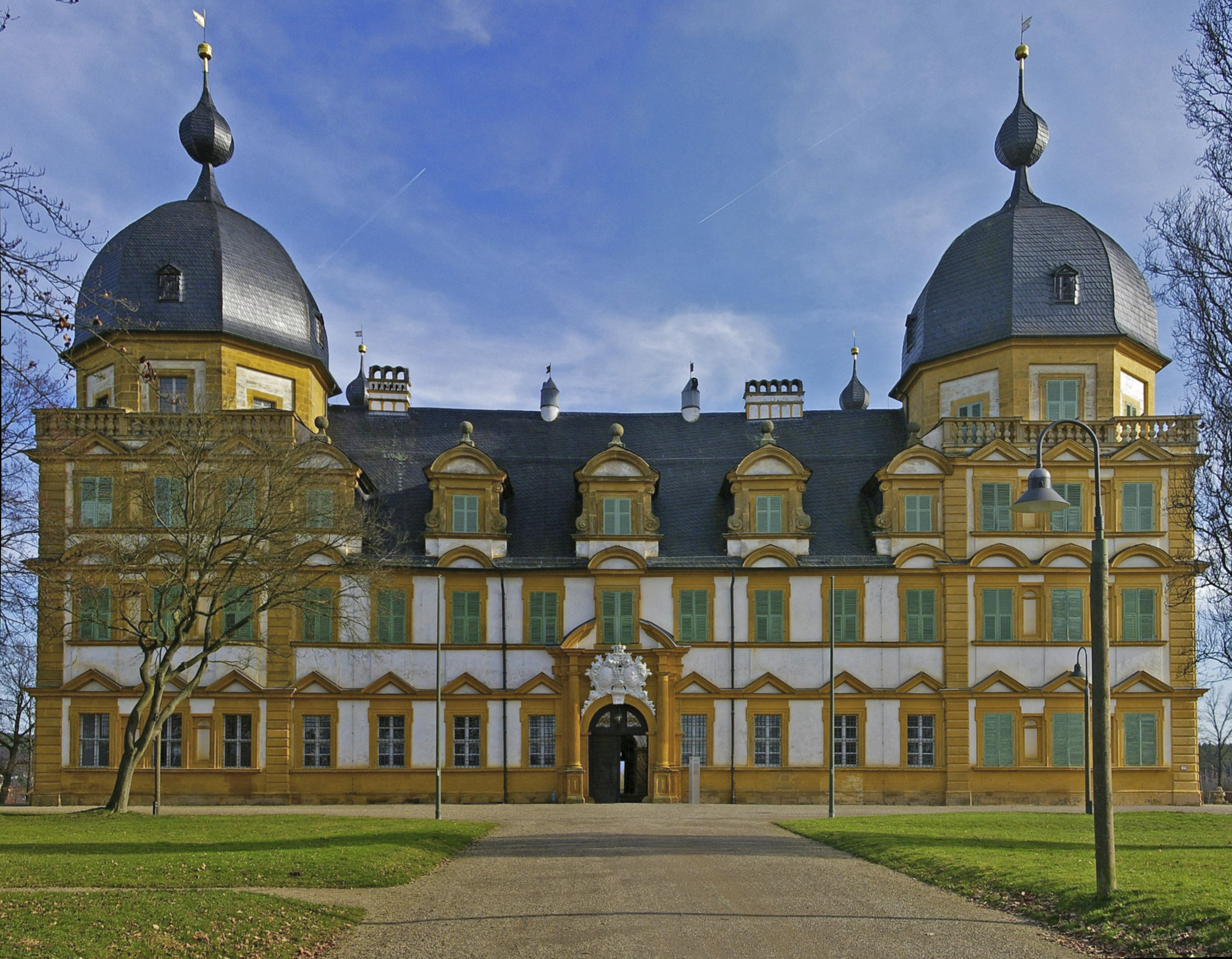
Seehof Castle near Bamberg, summer residence

The 39th bishop, Georg Schenk von Limpurg had a procedure for the judgment of capital crimes (Halsgerichtsordnung) drawn up by Johann of Schwarzenberg in 1507, which later became a model for the Constitutio Criminalis Carolina agreed at the 1530 Diet of Augsburg. Bishop Georg, though a confidant of Emperor Maximilian I, was inclined toward the Reformation movement of Martin Luther, which caused a violent social outbreak under his successor Weigand, ruling from 1522 to 1556. Morevover, the city suffered severely in the Second Margrave War (1552–54), when Albert Alcibiades' forces occupied large parts of the bishopric. After the war, the bishop had the Forchheim Fortress erected.

From 1609 onwards Prince-Bishop Johann Gottfried von Aschhausen, also elected Bishop of Würzburg in 1617, and his successor Johann Georg Fuchs von Dornheim enacted stern Counter-Reformation measures. Under their rule, Bamberg also became notorious as a centre of witch-hunt in the Holy Roman Empire. Among the numerous victims of the Bamberg witch trials were Dorothea Flock as well as the Bamberg mayor Johannes Junius, which even provoked an intervention by the Diet of Regensburg in 1630.

Meanwhile, the Bamberg estates were devastated in the Thirty Years' War. Bishop Johann Georg fled to his remote Carinthian estates in 1631 and his successor Franz von Hatzfeld was likewise expelled, when the Bamberg and Würzburg bishoprics was placed under the jurisdiction of Prince Bernard of Saxe-Weimar, who obtained the title of a "Duke of Franconia" from the hands of the Swedish chancellor Axel Oxenstierna in 1633. The prince-bishops were able to return and recover their possessions after Bernard's defeat at Nördlingen 1634.

In 1647 Bishop Melchior Otto Voit von Salzburg established the University of Bamberg (Academia Bambergensis). In the late 17th century his successors had the Baroque summer residence Schloss Seehof erected and a new residence in Bamberg completed according to plans by Leonhard Dientzenhofer. Highly indebted by the burdens of the Seven Years' War, the prince-bishops had to sell the Carinthian estates to their Habsburg allies in 1759.

=== Secularisation ===
During the French Revolutionary Wars, Bamberg was overrun by French troops and the last prince-bishop, Christoph Franz von Buseck, fled to Prague in 1796. Though he once again returned in 1800 and appointed his nephew Georg Karl Ignaz von Fechenbach zu Laudenbach coadjutor, he had to face the occupation by the Bavarian troops of Elector Maximilian IV Joseph in 1802.

After Bishop Christoph Franz officially resigned on 29 September 1802, the Bamberg estates and assets, such as the extensive collections of the Banz and Michaelsberg abbeys or the Bamberg treasury with the Reliquary Crown of Henry II, were seized by the Bavarian state. In the course of the German Mediatisation, agreed by the Perpetual Diet of Regensburg on 25 February 1803 (Reichsdeputationshauptschluss), Bamberg was finally annexed to Bavaria. From 1808 to 1817 the See was vacant; but by the Bavarian Concordat of the latter year it was raised to an archbishopric, with Würzburg, Speyer, and Eichstädt as suffragan sees.

== Patronage ==
The prince-bishops operated courts like minor royalty and employed artists, in particular musicians. Kapellmeisters and organists attached to the court included several minor South German masters such as Heinrich Pfendner, Johann Baal, Georg Arnold and Georg Mengel.

== See also ==
- Roman Catholic Archdiocese of Bamberg
