= Melchior Otto Voit von Salzburg =

- Prince-Bishop-elect of Bamberg
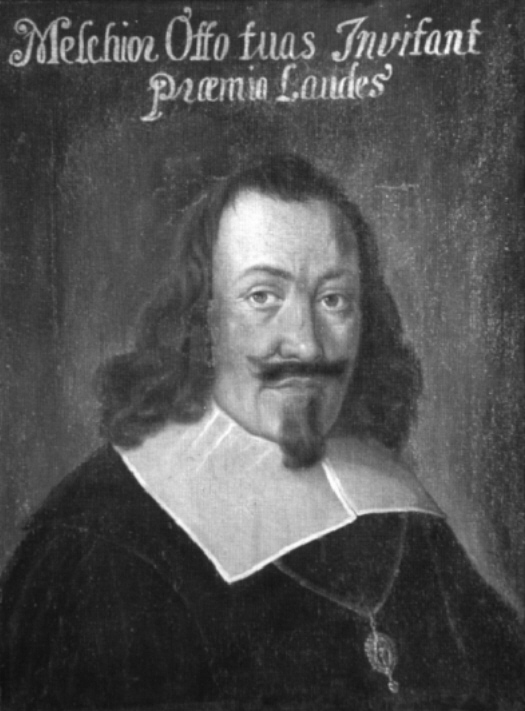
- Church: Catholic Church
- Diocese: Diocese of Bamberg
- In office: 7 May 1643 – 4 January 1643
- Predecessor: Franz von Hatzfeld
- Successor: Philipp Valentin Albrecht Voit von Rieneck

Personal details
- Born: 19 June 1603 Eichenhausen (part of present-day Wülfershausen), Prince-Bishopric of Würzburg, Franconian Circle, Holy Roman Empire
- Died: 4 January 1653 (aged 49)

Melchior Otto Voit von Salzburg (19 June 1603 – 4 January 1653) was the Prince-Bishop of Bamberg from 1642 to 1653.

== Biography ==
Melchior Otto von Voit von Salzburg was born in Eichenhausen, which is today part of Wülfershausen, on 19 June 1603.

He served as a Landrichter (judge) in Würzburg and later as cantor of Würzburg Cathedral.

He was appointed Prince-Bishop of Bamberg on 25 August 1642, with Pope Urban VIII confirming his appointment on 5 May 1643. He was never consecrated as a bishop, and died with the clerical rank of priest.

As bishop-elect, he founded the Ottoniana Academia (named after his patron saint, Otto of Bamberg), which later became the University of Bamberg.

He died on 4 January 1653.

Catholic Church titles
Preceded by Franz von Hatzfeld	Prince-Bishop of Bamberg; 1642–1653	Succeeded by Philipp Valentin Albrecht Voit von Rieneck
