= Philipp Adolf von Ehrenberg =

Prince-Bishop of Wurzburg, orchestrator of the Wurzburg witch-trials

- Prince-Bishop-elect of Würzburg
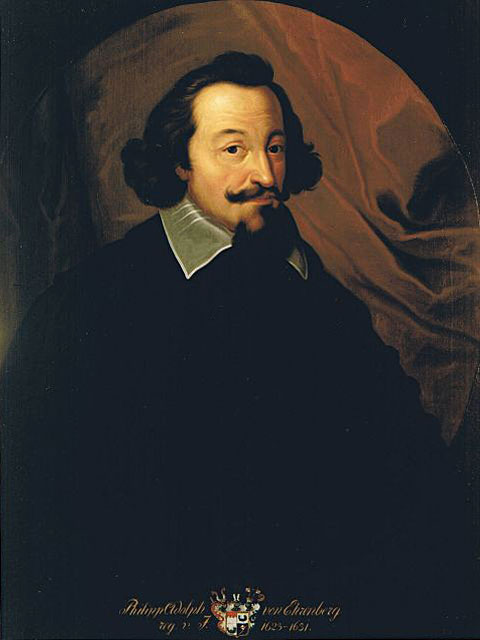
- Church: Catholic Church
- Diocese: Diocese of Würzburg
- In office: 19 March 1624 – 16 July 1631
- Predecessor: Johann Gottfried von Aschhausen
- Successor: Franz von Hatzfeld

Personal details
- Born: 23 September 1583 Heinsheim (in present-day Bad Rappenau), Holy Roman Empire
- Died: 16 July 1631 (aged 47)

Philipp Adolf von Ehrenberg (23 September 1583 – 16 July 1631) was the Prince-Bishop of Würzburg from 1622 to 1631.

Philipp Adolf von Ehrenberg was born in Heinsheim, which is today a district of Bad Rappenau, on 23 September 1583, the son of Johann Heinrich von Ehrenberg (d. 1584). His mother was the sister of Julius Echter von Mespelbrunn, who was Prince-Bishop of Würzburg from 1573 to 1617, and led the massive witch-hunt of Würzburg alongside his son.

The cathedral chapter of Würzburg Cathedral elected him to be Prince-Bishop of Würzburg on 6 February 1623, with Pope Urban VIII confirming his appointment on 19 March 1624.

As bishop, von Ehrenberg was a fierce supporter of the Counter-Reformation and supported re-Catholicization throughout his territories. He oversaw the Würzburg witch trials, a massive witch-hunt in his bishopric from 1626 to 1631, during which time some 900 alleged witches were executed, most by burning at the stake. His nephew, Ernst, was accused, convicted, beheaded, and burnt. He died on 16 July 1631, aged 47.

Catholic Church titles
Preceded by Johann Gottfried von Aschhausen	Prince-Bishop of Würzburg; 1622–1631	Succeeded by Franz von Hatzfeld
