= Johann Baal =

German composer

- Birth name: Johann Baal
- Also known as: Pater Marianus Baal
- Born: 18 December 1657; Karlstadt, Germany
- Died: 1701 (aged 43–44)
- Genres: Classical
- Occupation: Composer

Johann Baal also Pater Marianus Baal (18 December 1657 in Karlstadt – 1701) was a German composer. Baal was attached to the court of the Prince-Bishopric of Bamberg. Among Baal's surviving works is a Mass in A, the five sections of which survive in the handwriting of a copy by Johann Sebastian Bach and his cousin Johann Gottfried Walther.

== Recordings ==
- Mass in A. Instrumental works. Musica Canterey Bamberg, dir. Gerhard Weinzierl 1997
