= Georg Haan =

Victim of the Bamberg witch trials (died 1628)

Georg Haan (died 14 July 1628) was a prominent victim of the Bamberg witch trials.

Georg Haan was a doctor and member of the city council of Bamberg. He was married to Katharina Haan and had two daughters, Katharina and Ursula, and four sons named Adam, Carl, Daniel and Leonhard. Haan was among the most well known secular personalities in Bamberg. He publicly opposed the policy of witch persecution by prince Bishop Johann Georg Fuchs von Dornheim.

In 1627, he sued the Prince Bishop before the Imperial Diet in Speyer. Haan departed for Speyer on 27 December. Shortly after his departure, his wife was arrested for witchcraft after having been pointed out by, among others, Hans Morhaubt, the son of Christina Morhaubt (who herself was burnt alive in August 1627). Katharina Haan was tortured until she confessed and was burnt alive after 16 January 1628. Shortly after, her daughter and namesake was swiftly arrested, tortured, sentenced and burnt.

When Georg Haan returned to Bamberg, he found that his wife and daughter had been arrested, condemned, and executed during his absence, and that his personal safety was also in danger. To avoid an arrest, Maximilian I, Elector of Bavaria attempted to save him by offering to employ him, but the messenger he sent to Bamberg to deliver this news was prevented from reaching the city. Shortly after, Georg was arrested and accused of sorcery. According to protocol, he had been denounced by his son, Adam. He confessed to sorcery and was executed on 14 July 1628. In his will, he left his entire fortune to his children and other private people, and nothing to the Church. The following year, 1629, his remaining daughter, Ursula, and his son, Adam, were arrested and burnt. His remaining three sons (Carl, Daniel and Leonhard) were given protection by the Dominican Heilig Grab Abbey and survived the witch trials, which finally ended in 1632.

== See also ==
- Dorothea Flock
- Johannes Junius

== Sources ==
- Britta Gehm: Die Hexenverfolgung im Hochstift Bamberg und das Eingreifen des Reichshofrates zu ihrer Beendigung (= Rechtsgeschichte und Zivilisationsprozess. Nr. 3)
- überarbeitete Auflage. Olms, Hildesheim 2012; ISBN 978-3-487-14731-4, S. 214–243.
