= Johann Philipp von Gebsattel =

German Prince-Bishop (1555–1609)

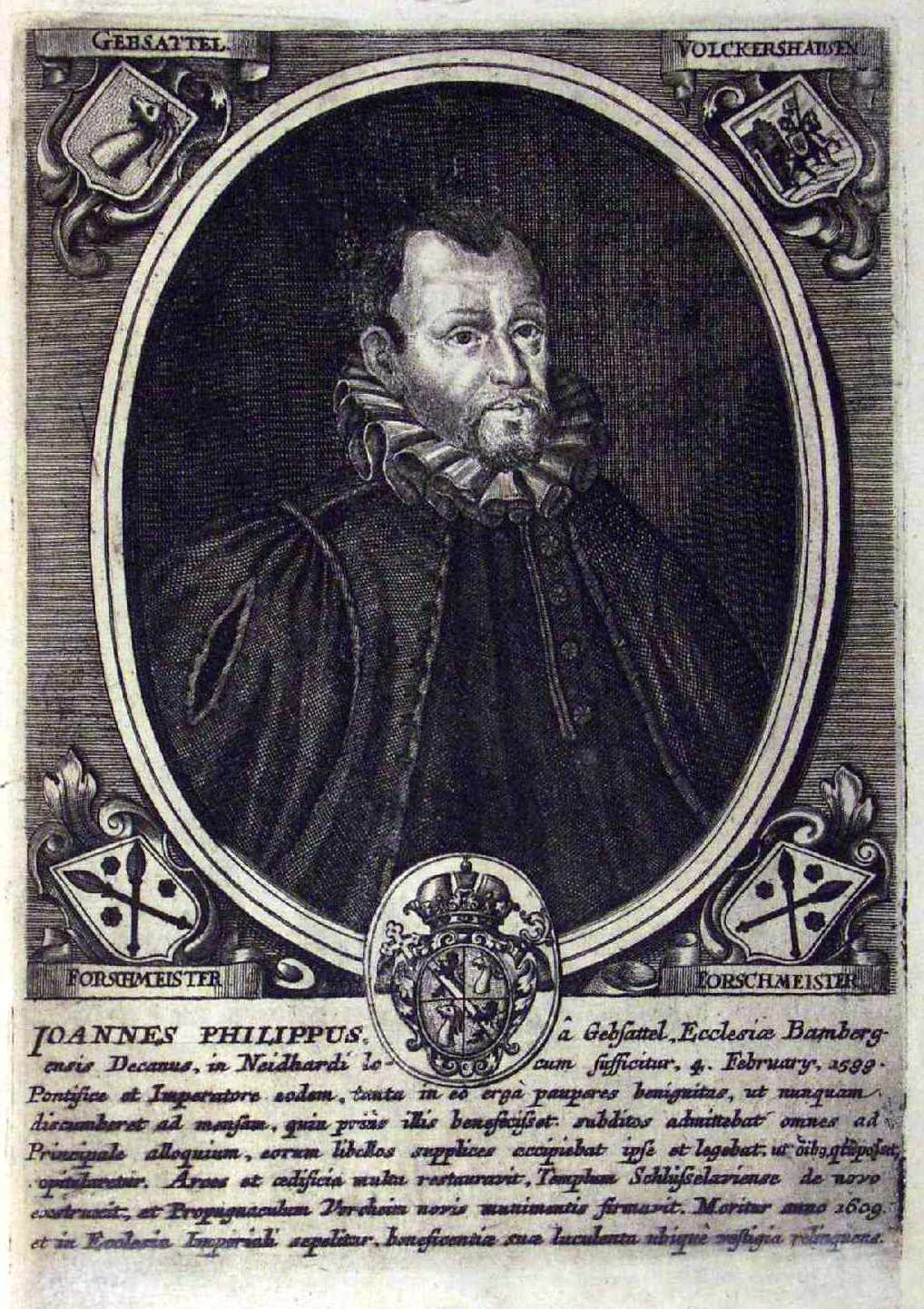
Engraving of Johann Philipp von Gebsattel by Johann Salver.

Johann Philipp von Gebsattel (13 May 1555 – 26 June 1609) was the Prince-Bishop of Bamberg from 1599 to 1609.

== Biography ==
Johann Philipp von Gebsattel was born on 13 May 1555. He was elected Prince-Bishop of Bamberg on 4 February 1599, with Pope Clement VIII confirming his appointment on 19 July 1599. He was never consecrated as a bishop and remained a deacon at the time of his death. He died on 26 June 1609, aged 54, and is buried in Michaelsberg Abbey, Bamberg. The abbey was dissolved in 1803.

== See also ==
Catholic Church titles
Preceded by Neytard von Thüngen	Prince-Bishop of Bamberg; 1599–1609	Succeeded by Johann Gottfried von Aschhausen
