= Dorothea Flock =

German woman executed for witchcraft (1608-1630)

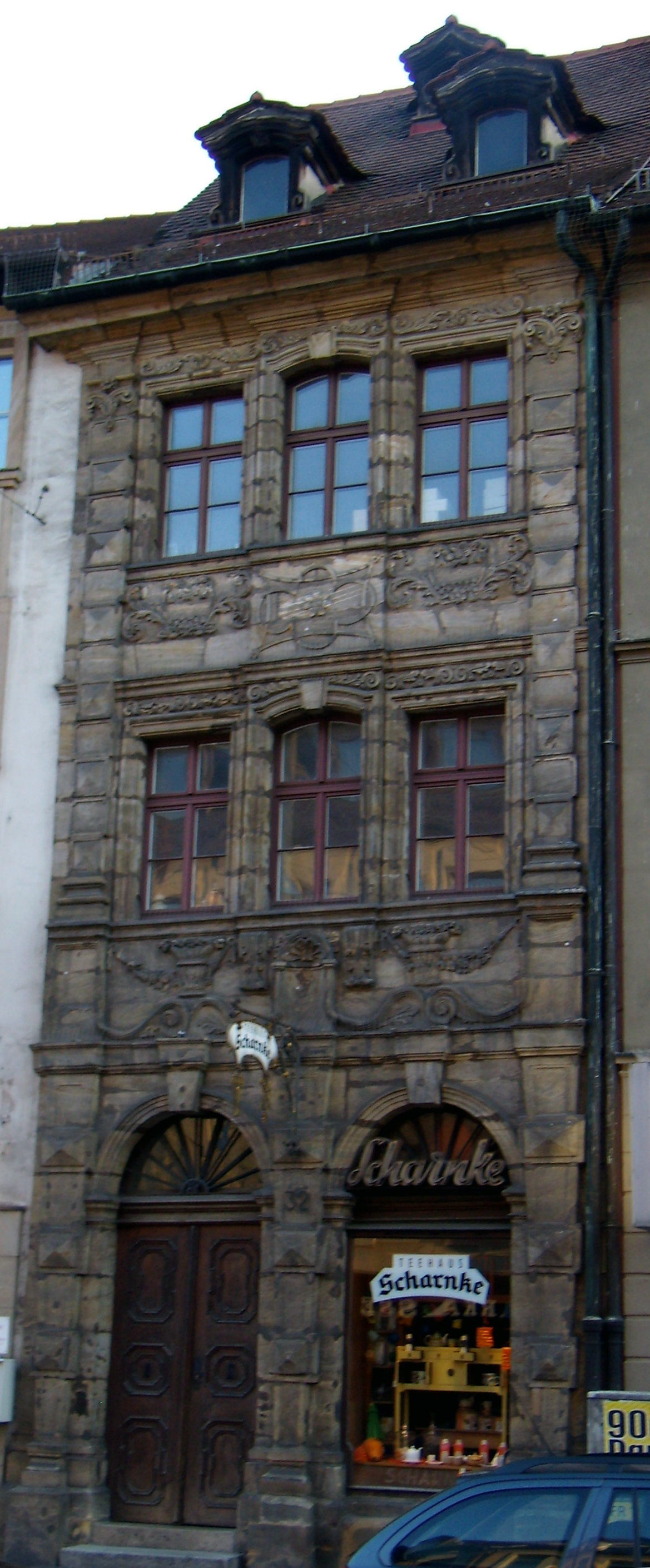
Flock's former house in present-day Bamberg, Lange Straße 32

Dorothea Flock (1608 – 17 May 1630), was a German woman convicted of witchcraft in Bamberg and a victim of the Bamberg witch trials during the reign of Prince-Bishop Johann Georg Fuchs von Dornheim.

== Biography ==
Dorothea Flock was born in the city of Nuremberg. She was the second wife of Bamberg’s councilor Georg Heinrich Flock. Their house was in Bamberg, Lange Straße 32. Already his first wife Apolonia had been executed for witchcraft in May 1628. Based on an anonymous accusation Dorothea was arrested in December 1629 and imprisoned for alleged adultery. She escaped from custody but shortly afterwards she was caught again. This time she was accused of witchcraft. Georg Heinrich Flock fled to Protestant Nuremberg to his wife's relatives, the Hofmanns who were a respected, wealthy and influential merchant family. Together with them Georg Heinrich Flock hoped to free his wife Dorothea, who was heavily pregnant. During the following weeks the family tried to secure Dorothea's release. They objected to the procedure against Dorothea Flock and considered the circumstantial evidence insufficient to imprison her any longer. A custody transfer from the prison of the Malefizhaus to the building of the old court was achieved but she remained in heavy chains. With the help of a Nuremberg notary public and the intercessions of patricians of Nuremberg they again appealed to the prince-bishop and to Friedrich Förner. In addition, Georg Heinrich and Dorothea´s sister Magdalena hoped for help from Georg Heinrich´s cousin, who as a high-ranking officer of the imperial army, was commanding a regiment in the Netherlands. He held out the prospect of using his influence with Isabella Clara Eugenia, the Spanish infanta and governor of the Netherlands. Meanwhile, Magdalena won over Würzburg´s guardian of the Order of Friars Minor Capuchin to petition to the prince-bishop pleading for mercy for Dorothea Flock.

But all measures, further interventions by notaries public as well as the efforts of the Nuremberg council remained unsuccessful. Georg Heinrich Flock had no other option but to turn with a supplication to the Imperial Aulic Council in Vienna. Then the tide seemed to turn: On 18 March 1630, Georg Heinrich obtained for his wife a mandate by which Dorothea should be granted easing of detention until childbirth and the assistance of an advocate; and the prince-bishop was called for mediation "so that there is no cause for complaint". The prince-bishop did not reply.

Therefore, on 23 March 1630, Georg Heinrich again contacted the Imperial Aulic Council, which thereupon strengthened its mandate. Again there was no reaction from Bamberg. Only when on 17 April Duke of Fürstenberg, president of the Aulic Council, himself stepped into the case and Georg Heinrich even threatened to appeal to the pope, the prince-bishop replied to the first mandate of 18 March. He extensively took a stand against the allegation, appeased the situation and mentioned that Dorothea in the meantime had given birth to a healthy daughter. He defended his actions and had not changed his opinion in the least. On 28 April he even let Dorothea Flock – six weeks after childbirth – transfer into the Malefizhaus in Bamberg again. But also the Aulic Council remained determined and issued another mandate on 11 May. This however reached Bamberg five days too late. Under torture Dorothea Flock had already confessed the crime of witchcraft and was sentenced to death by the court of lay assessors on 14 May.

Before execution Dorothea Flock was to be gripped with red-hot pincers, then burnt alive. The remnants of her corpse were to be burnt to powder and ashes because of her alleged misdeeds by witchcraft, her reneging God Almighty and the Holy Trinity. The witch hunters learned of the imminent arrival of the mandate. They accelerated the execution and Dorothea was killed half an hour before the messenger arrived with the Imperial order of her release. Due to these events, a resistance circle called "Hofmann’s friendship", with Georg Heinrich Flock and the Hofmanns, was formed in Nuremberg to agitate against further witch trials. They used the meeting of the electoral princes in Regensburg from July to September 1630 to make public to the participants the numerous infringements of laws in Bamberg.

== See also ==
- Georg Haan
- Johannes Junius

== Literature and media ==
- Ralph Kloos: The factory of death. The true story of a hushed up mass murder
- Staatsbibl. BA Msc. 148/580 ff, 630 ff, 762; Sim 86
- Britta Gehm (2012), Die Hexenverfolgung im Hochstift Bamberg und das Eingreifen des Reichshofrates zu ihrer Beendigung (in German) (2., überarbeitete ed.), Hildesheim: Olms, ISBN 978-3-487-14731-4
- Heike Eva Schmidt (2012), Purpurmond : Roman (in German), München: PAN, ISBN 978-3-426-28366-0
- Sabine Weigand: Die Seelen im Feuer (souls in fire). Novel. 2008, ISBN 978-3-8105-2663-2
- Der ZDF Spielfilm Die Seelen im Feuer (souls in fire) of 2015 according to the novel of Sabine Weigand deals with the persecution of alleged witches in Bamberg.
