= Johann Georg Fuchs von Dornheim =

Roman Prince-Bishop who presided over the Bamberg witch trials (1586–1633)

His Excellency Johann Georg Fuchs von Dornheim
- Prince-Bishopric of Bamberg
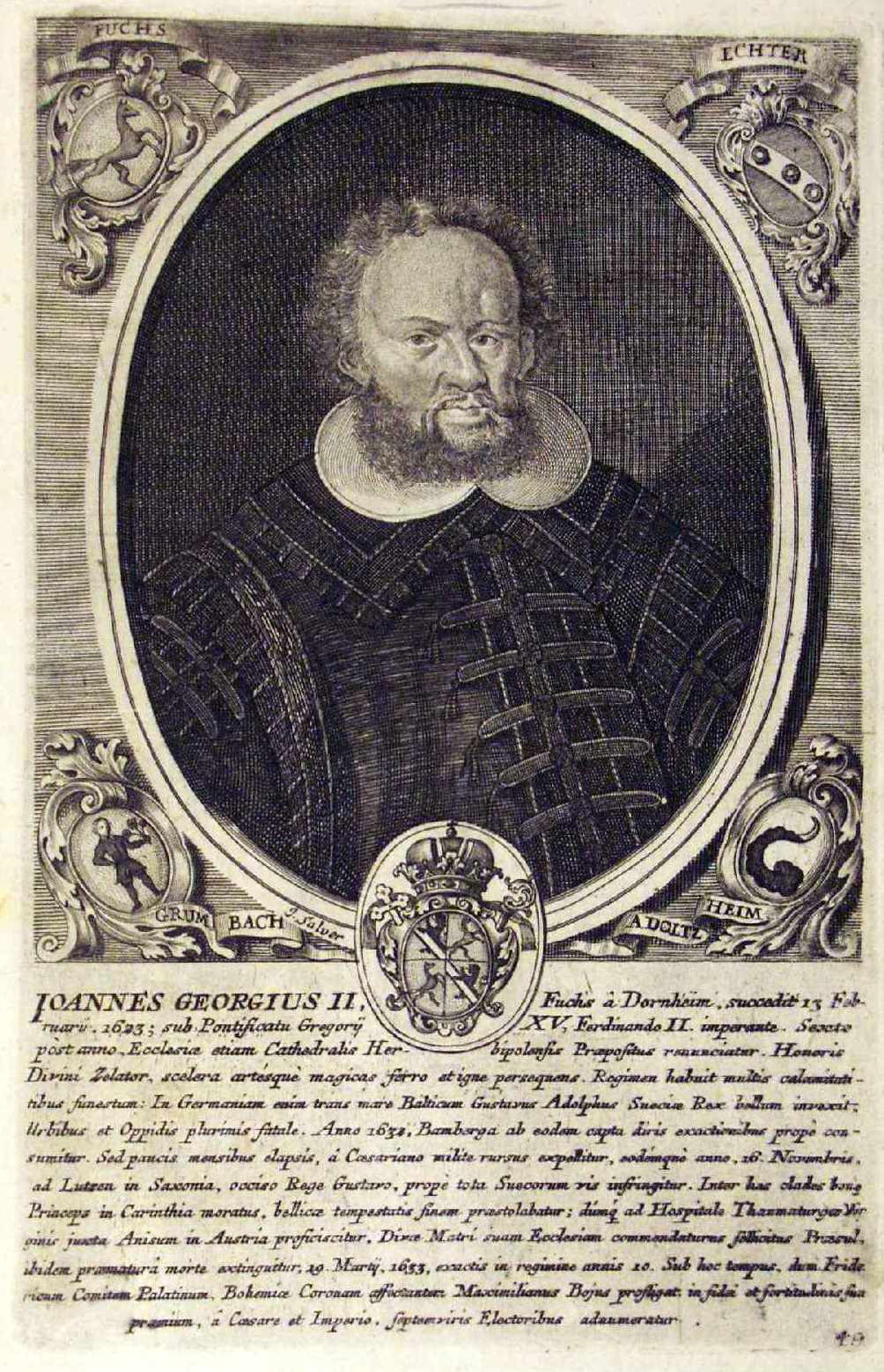
- Engraving of Johann Georg Fuchs von Dornheim by Johann Salver
- Church: Catholic Church
- See: Bamberg
- Appointed: 13 February 1623
- Term ended: 29 March 1633
- Predecessor: Johann Gottfried von Aschhausen
- Successor: Christoph Franz von Buseck

Orders
- Rank: Prince-Bishop

Personal details
- Born: 23 April 1586 Wiesentheid, Lower Franconia, Holy Roman Empire
- Died: 29 March 1633 (aged 46) Spital am Pyhrn, Austria
- Denomination: Roman Catholic
- Profession: Cleric, ecclesiastical prince
- Education: University of Bologna

Johann Georg Fuchs von Dornheim (23 April 1586 – 29 March 1633) was the Prince-Bishop of Bamberg from 1623 to 1633. He was known as the "Hexenbrenner" (witch burner) and the "Hexenbischof" (witch-bishop) for presiding over the most intensive period of witch trials in early modern Bamberg.

== Biography ==
Johann Georg Fuchs von Dornheim was born in Wiesentheid on 23 April 1586; he became Prince-Bishop of Bamberg on 13 February 1623.

Motivated by the Counter-Reformation, Fuchs von Dornheim presided over the Bamberg witch trials, which lasted from 1626 to 1631. As part of the trials, he ordered the construction of a "witch-house", a prison which featured a torture chamber adorned with Bible verses. These trials led to the execution of 300–600 individuals, the most notable of which was Bamberg burgomaster Johannes Junius.

Amid the Thirty Years' War, troops under Gustavus Adolphus of Sweden and John George I, Elector of Saxony occupied the Prince-Bishopric of Bamberg on 11 February 1632, forcing Fuchs von Dornheim to flee the city. He died in exile in Spital am Pyhrn, Austria on 29 March 1633, aged 46.

Catholic Church titles
Preceded by Johann Gottfried von Aschhausen	Prince-Bishop of Bamberg; 1623–1633	Succeeded by Franz von Hatzfeld
