= Zeil am Main =

- Town
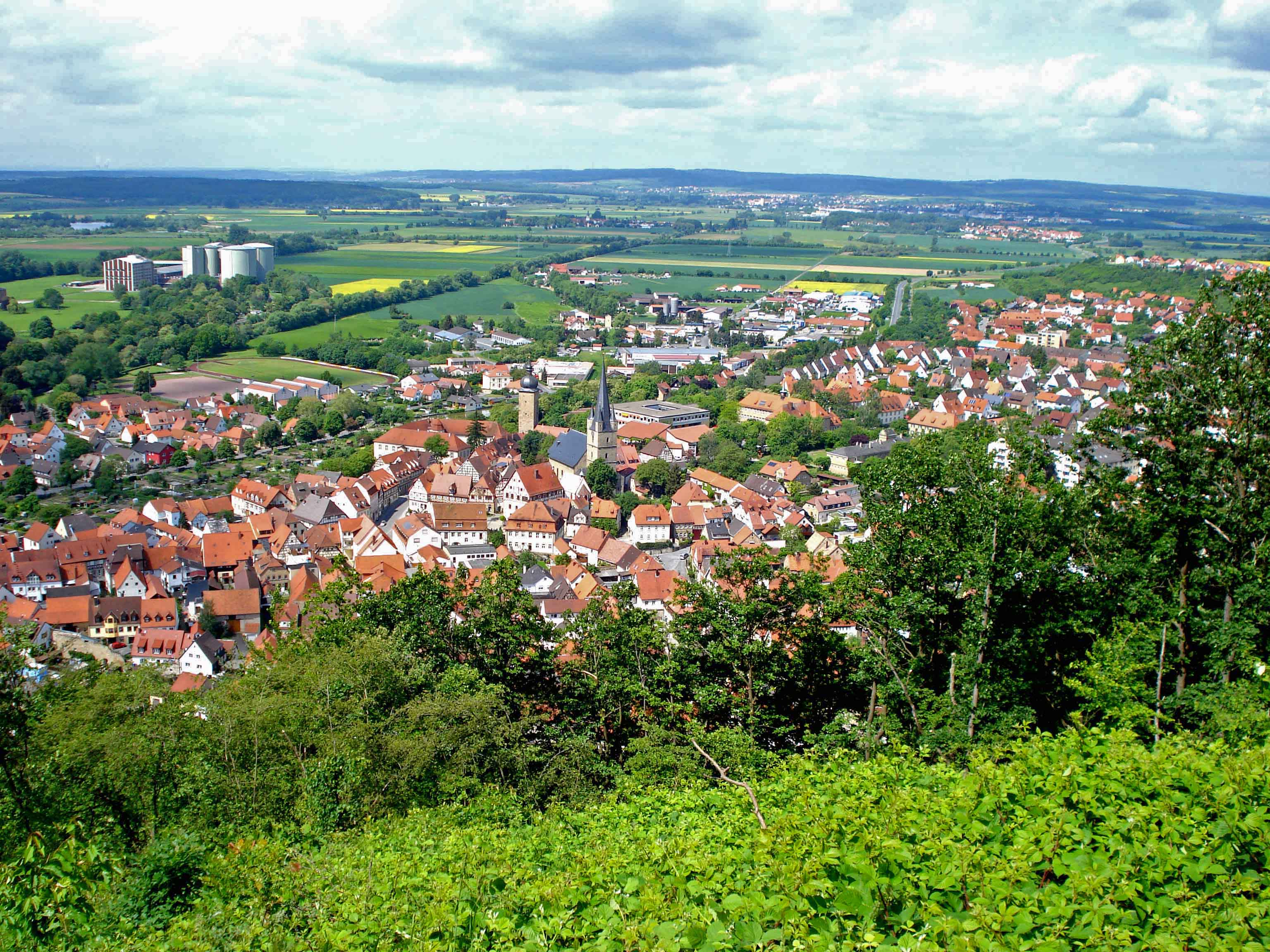
- General view of the town

- Coat of arms

- Location of Zeil am Main within Haßberge district
- Interactive map of Zeil am Main
- Location within Germany Location within Bavaria
- Coordinates: 50°01′N 10°36′E
- Country: Germany
- State: Bavaria
- Admin. region: Unterfranken
- District: Haßberge

Government
  - Mayor (2020–26): Thomas Stadelmann (SPD)

Area
  - Total: 35.72 km^{2} (13.79 sq mi)
- Elevation: 230 m (750 ft)

Population (2025-12-31)
  - Total: 5,506
  - Density: 154.1/km^{2} (399.2/sq mi)
- Time zone: UTC+01:00 (CET)
  - Summer (DST): UTC+02:00 (CEST)
- Postal codes: 97475
- Dialling codes: 09524
- Vehicle registration: HAS
- Website: www.zeil-am-main.de

Zeil am Main (German pronunciation: [ˈtsaɪl ʔam ˈmaɪn], lit. 'Zeil on the Main') is a town in the Haßberge district in Lower Franconia, an area in the federal state of Bavaria, Germany. It is situated on the right bank of the Main, 7 km east of Haßfurt, 24 km northwest of Bamberg, and 25 km east of Schweinfurt. Zeil is a historic Franconian town known for its old churches, romantic houses, medieval walls and towers, the hill church of "Zeiler Käpelle", and the castle ruins of the Schmachtenburg.

== History ==
Zeil am Main is located in an area of the River Main valley where, since the 11th century, the dioceses of Würzburg and Bamberg overlapped and vied for domain of the region. Zeil's strategic location between the dioceses, situated on the River Main trade route and military road between Nuremberg and Schweinfurt, ensured that Zeil was worthy of possession by regional powers.

The earliest evidence of Zeil am Main as a city is in a 1018 AD deed of donation signed by Henry II, King of the Romans. Bishop Lamprecht of Prun granted municipal law to the city in 1379 and allowed citizens of Zeil to build protective fortifications. As a result, the city wall was constructed with numerous towers, and Schmachtenberg castle was built. King Wenceslaus of Bohemia entitled the community with special laws to use the river Main commercially in 1397. The prince bishops of Bamberg used Zeil's strategic location as a northern enclave to provide a buffer against their Würzburg rivals, and 1695 saw the construction of a hunting lodge for the prince bishop. In the early 19th century, church lands were secularized, and Zeil am Main became a municipality within Bavaria by edict in 1818.

Bella Katz Oberbrunner, the mother of Goldman Sachs's founder Marcus Goldman, was born in Zeil Am Main.

== Culture ==
Viticulture is still practised in Zeil. Vines are grown on mountain slopes around the city. The summer wine celebration in the old part of town is the high point of the year. In addition, the Göller brewery's Zeiler beer bears the name of the city.

== Sons and daughters of the town ==
- Alberich Degen (1625-1686), 42nd abbot of the Cistercian monastery Ebrach
- Franz Burger (1836-1920), a Catholic farmer functionary, mayor and member of Landtag and member of Reichstag
- Heinrich Schneier (born 1925), politician, (SPD), member of Landtag

== Gallery ==
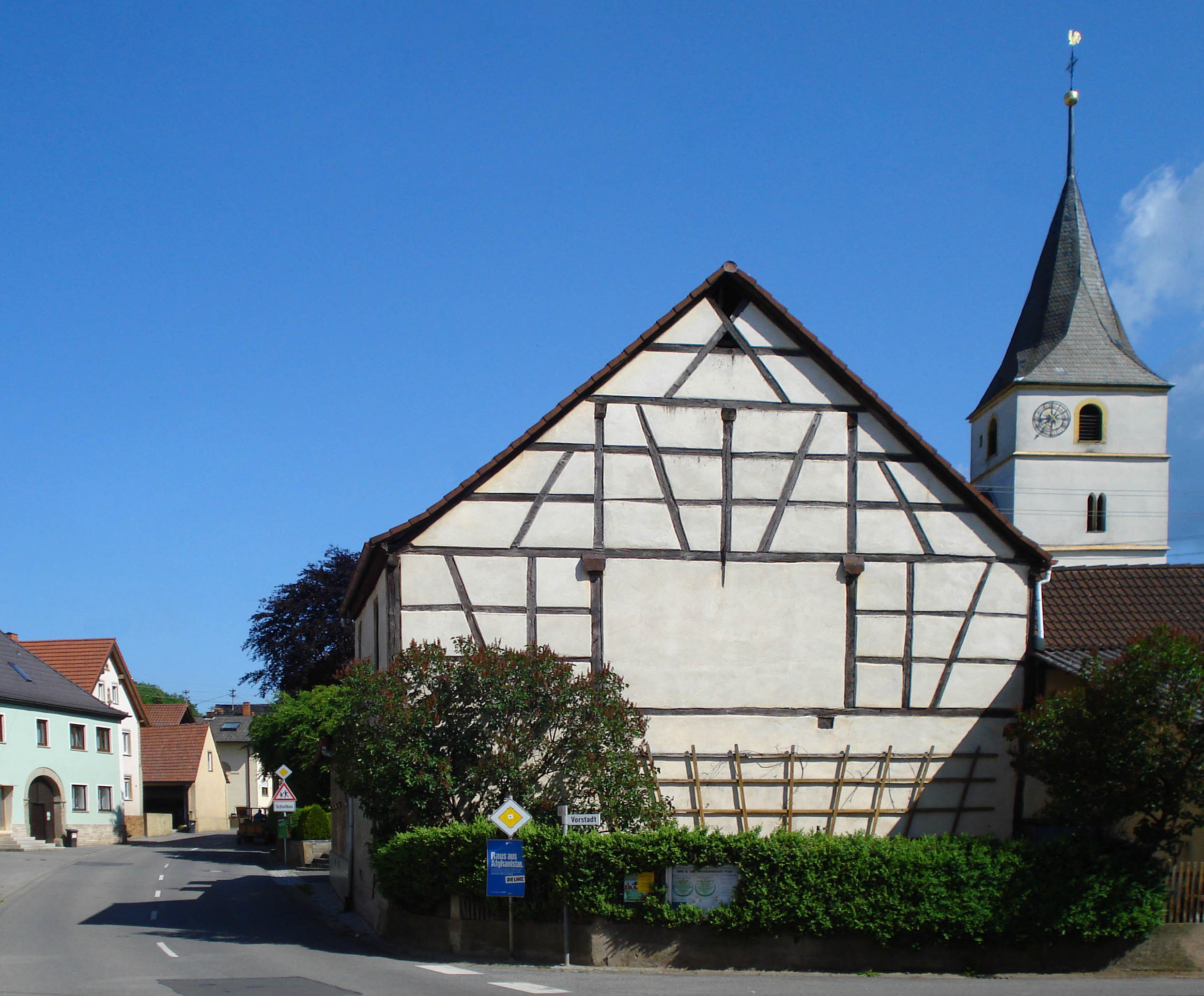
District Krum

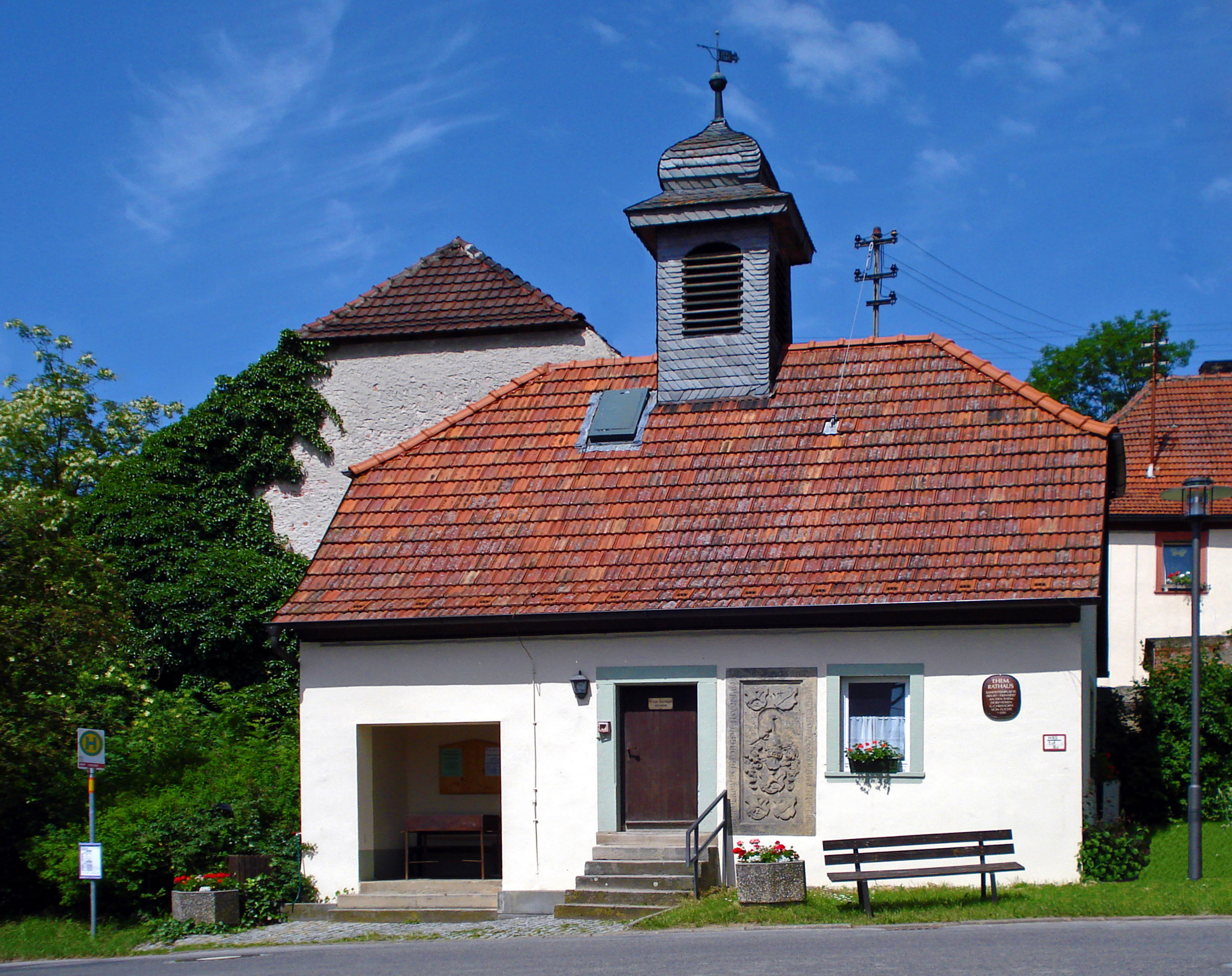
District Bischofsheim

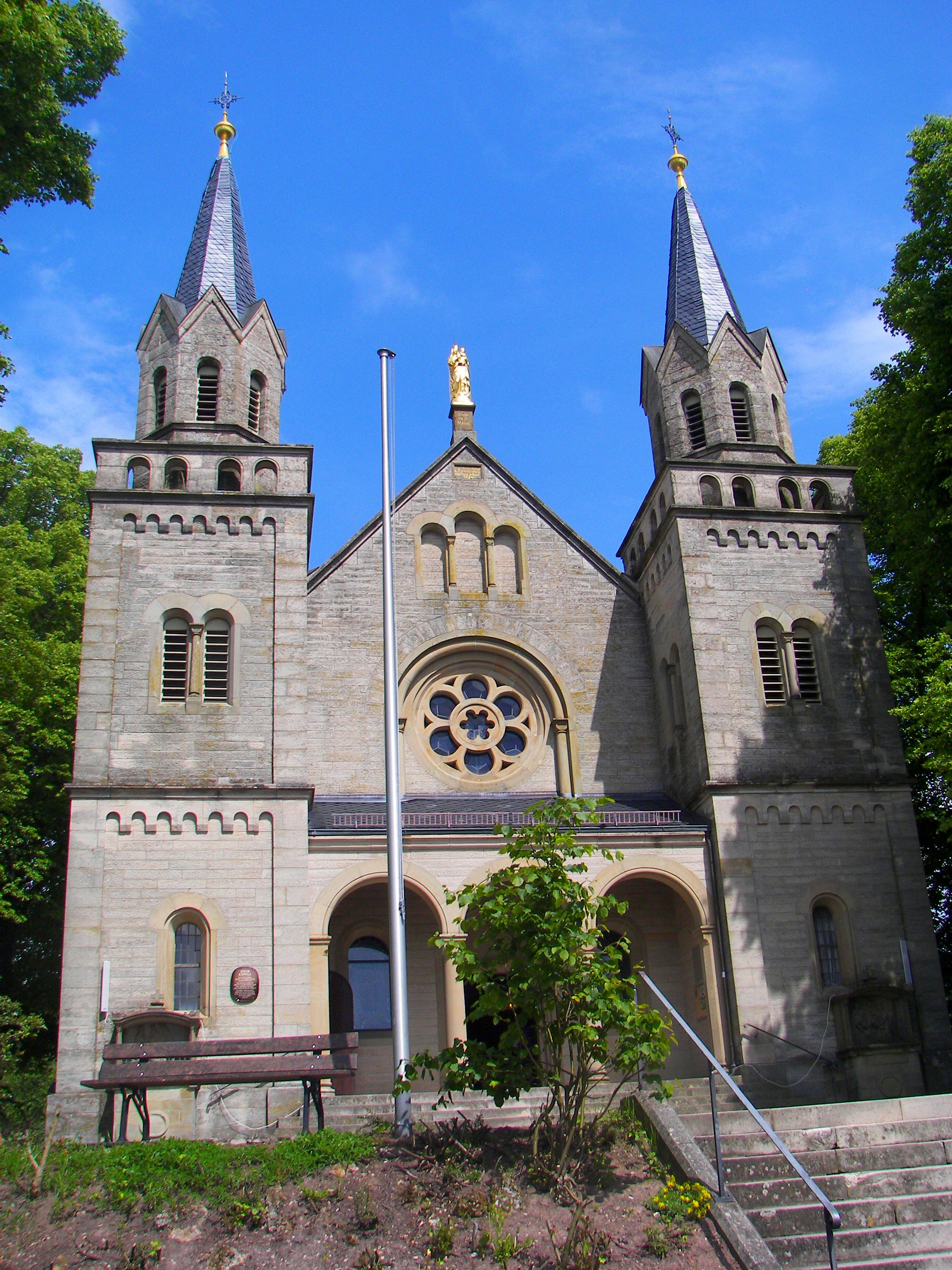
The hill church "Zeiler Käpelle",

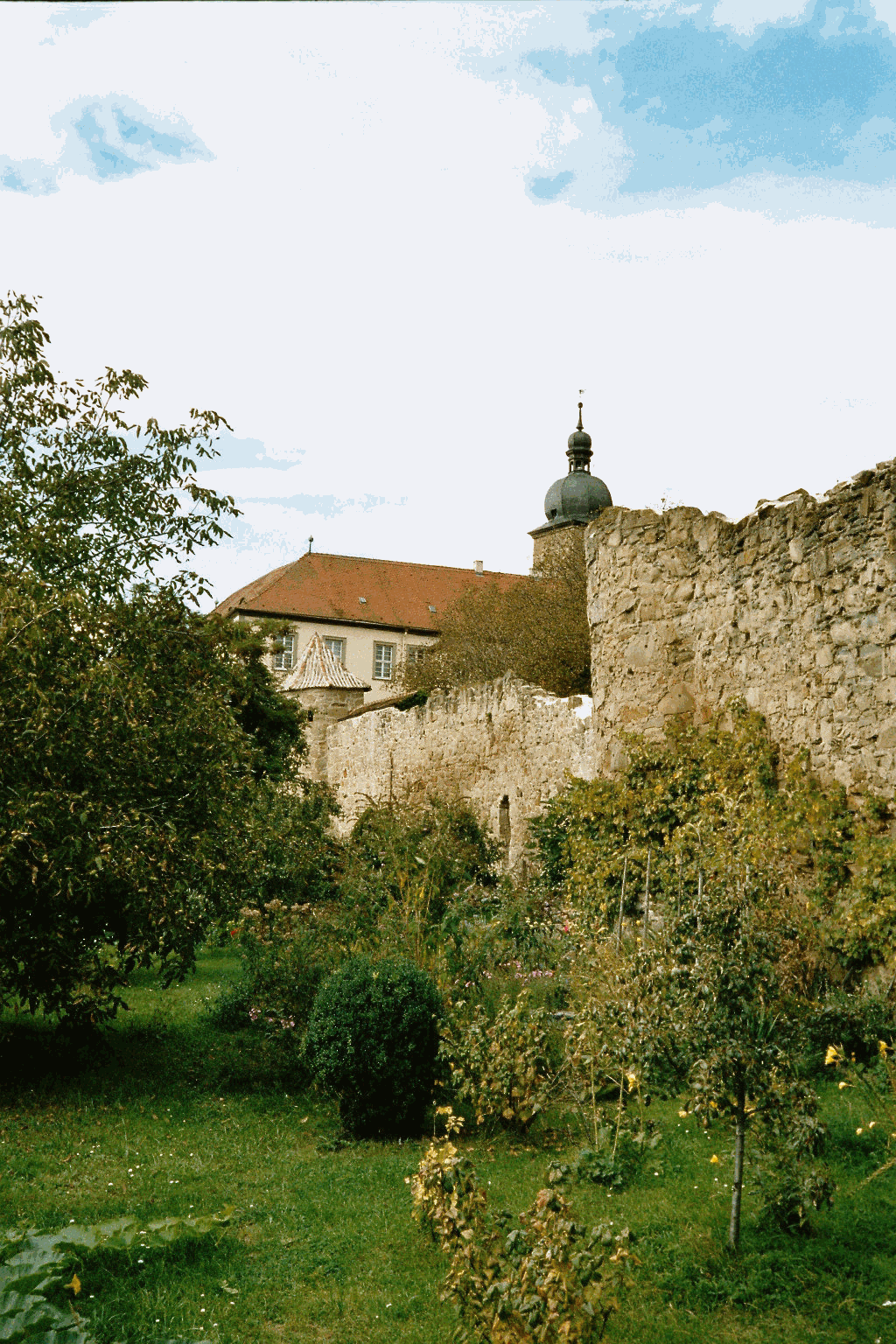
Medieval walls and in the background the Propstenhof
