= Johannes Junius =

Mayor of Bamberg and alleged witch (c. 1573–1628)

- Born: 1573; Bamberg, Holy Roman Empire
- Died: 6 August 1628 (aged 54–55); Bamberg, Holy Roman Empire
- Occupation: Mayor of Bamberg
- Known for: Victim of the Bamberg witch trials

Johannes Junius (1573 – 6 August 1628) was the mayor (German: Bürgermeister) of Bamberg, and a victim of the Bamberg witch trials, who wrote a letter to his daughter from jail while he awaited execution for witchcraft.

== Arrest ==
Junius had first entered local politics in 1608 and had held the title of Bürgermeister in the years 1614, 1617, and 1621, and from the years 1624 to 1628. The Bamberg witch trials, which lasted from 1626 to 1631, were presided over by Prince-Bishop Johann Georg, who was dedicated to spreading the Counter-Reformation. There had been suspicion of Junius being a witch due to his wife having been executed for witchcraft. Another Bürgermeister, Georg Neudecker had been accused of witchcraft and, following his imprisonment in April 1628, named Junius as an accomplice, leading to the latter's arrest in June 1628. Junius was also implicated in the confessions of other suspected witches.

Court documents reveal how Junius at first denied all charges and demanded to confront his witnesses, and continued to deny his involvement in witchcraft after weeks of torture, which included the application of thumbscrews, leg vises (Beinschrauben), and strappado. He told his daughter Veronica that he was subjected to torture and also led through the streets and told to pick out other witches. He finally confessed on 5 July 1628, in which he claimed that he had renounced God for the Devil and that he had seen twenty-seven of his colleagues at a sabbat. Junius was publicly burned to death one month later.

== Confession ==
In his confession, Junius relates that in 1624, while in a difficult financial state, he was seduced by a woman who later proved to be a demon and threatened to kill him unless he renounced God. At first Junius refused, but soon more demons materialised and attacked him further, finally convincing him to accept the Devil as his God. He took the witch-name of Krix and was provided with a familiar named Füchsin ("Vixen"), at which point several local townsfolk revealed themselves as similarly allied with Satan and congratulated him. Thereafter he regularly attended witch's sabbats, to which he rode on the back of a monstrous, flying black dog. At one such sabbat he attended a Black Mass at which Beelzebub made an appearance. Although his fellow witches and familiar demons had commanded him to kill his children in their name, he had been unable to perform this sacrifice, for which he was beaten. However, he did admit to having sacrificed his horse and burying a sacred wafer.

== Letter to daughter ==
On 24 July, shortly before his execution, Junius managed to write a letter to his daughter, Veronica, which was smuggled out of jail by a guard and successfully delivered. In the letter he names his torturers and their methods, as well as stating his intention to give a false confession and later tell the truth to a priest. He also defends his innocence, claims that those who testified against him have secretly begged his forgiveness, and recounts the abject horror of his torture (inflicted upon him by his brother-in-law and three others), from which his hands still shake at the time of writing the letter. He told Veronica that at first he attempted to create a confession in which he could not identify the other witches, but was forced to name names under threat of further torture. The letter begins: "Many hundred thousand good-nights, dearly beloved daughter Veronica," and ends "Good night, for your father Johannes Junius will see you no more."

=== Full contents of letter ===
Many hundred thousand good-nights, dearly beloved daughter Veronica. Innocent have I come into prison, innocent have I been tortured, innocent must I die. For whoever comes into the witch prison must become a witch or be tortured until he invents something out of his head and - God pity him- bethinks him of something. I will tell you how it has gone with me. When I was the first time put to the torture, Dr. Braun, Dr. Kotzendorffer, and two strange doctors were there. Then Dr. Braun, asks me, "Kinsman, how come you here?", I answer, "Through falsehood, through misfortune." "Hear, you," he says, "you are a witch; will you confess it voluntarily? If not, we'll bring in witnesses and the executioner for you." I said "I am no witch, I have a pure conscience in the matter; if there are a thousand witnesses, I am not anxious, but I'll gladly hear the witnesses." Now the chancellor's son was set before me ... and afterward Hoppfen Elss. She had seen me dance on Haupts-moor ... I answered: "I have never renounced God, and will never do it- God graciously keep me from it. I'll rather bear whatever I must." And then came also- God in highest Heaven have mercy- the executioner, and put the thumb-screws on me, both hands bound together, so that the blood ran out at the nails and everywhere, so that for four weeks I could not use my hands, as you can see from the writing ... Thereafter they first stripped me, bound my hands behind me, and drew me up in the torture. Then I thought heaven and earth were at an end; eight times did they draw me up and let me fall again, so that I suffered terrible agony ....

And this happened on Friday, June 30, and with God's help I had to bear the torture. When at last the executioner led me back into the prison, he said to me: "Sir, I beg you, for God's sake confess something, for you cannot endure the torture which you will be put to; and even if you bear it all, yet you will not escape, not even if you were an earl, but one torture will follow after another until you say you are a witch. Not before that," he said, "will they let you go, as you may see by all their trials, for one is just like another" ... And so I begged, since I was in a wretched plight, to be given one day for thought and a priest. The priest was refused me, but the time for thought was given. Now, my dear child, see what hazard I stood and still stand. I must say that I am a witch, though I am not, - must now renounce God, though I have never done it before Day and night I was deeply troubled, but a last there came to me a new idea. I would not be anxious, but, since I had been given no priest with whom I could take counsel, I would myself think of something and say it. It were surely better that I just say it with mouth and words, even though I had not really done it'; and afterwards I would confess it to the priest, and let those answer for it who compel me to do it. ... And so I made my confession, as follows; but it was all a lie.

Now follows, dear child, what I confessed in order to escape the great anguish and bitter torture, which it was impossible for me longer to bear. .... Then I had to tell what people I had seen [at the witch-sabbath]. I said that I had not recognized them. "You old rascal, I must set the executioner at you. Say- was not the Chancellor there?" So I said yes. "Who besides?" I had not recognized anybody. So he said: "Take one street after another; begin at the market, go out on one street and back on the next." I had to name several persons there. Then came the long street. I knew nobody. Had to name eight persons there. Then the Zinkenwert- one person more. Then over the upper bridge to the Georgthor, on both sides. Knew nobody again. Did I know nobody in the castle- whoever it might be, I should speak without fear. And thus continuously they asked me on all the streets, though I could not and would not say more. So they gave me to the executioner, told him to strip me, shave me all over, and put me to the torture. "The rascal knows one on the market-place, is with him daily, and yet won't know him." By that they meant Dietmery: so I had to name him too.

Then I had to tell what crimes I had committed. I said nothing. ..."Draw the rascal up!" So I said that I was to kill my children, but I had killed a horse instead. It did not help. I had also taken a sacred wafer, and had desecrated it. When I had said this, they left me in peace.

Now dear child, here you have all my confession, for which I must die. And they are sheer lies and made-up things, so help me God. For all this I was forced to say through fear of the torture which was threatened beyond what I had already endured. For they never leave off with the torture till one confesses something; be he never so good, he must be a witch. Nobody escapes, though he were an earl. ...

Dear child, keep this letter secret so that people do not find it, else I shall be tortured most piteously and the jailers will be beheaded. So strictly is it forbidden. ...Dear child, pay this man a dollar... I have taken several days to write this: my hands are both lame. I am in a sad plight. ... Good night, for your father Johannes Junius will never see you more. July 24, 1628.

[And on the margin of the letter he added: Dear child, six have confessed against me at once: the Chancellor, his son, Neudecker, Zaner, Hoffmaisters Ursel, and Hoppfen Else - all false, through compulsion, as they have all told me, and begged my forgiveness in God's name before they were executed. ... They know nothing but good of me. They were forced to say it, just as I myself was.]

== See also ==
- Dorothea Flock
- Georg Haan
