= Franconian Circle =

Imperial circle of the Holy Roman Empire

Franconian Circle Fränkischer Reichskreis
- Imperial circle of the Holy Roman Empire
- 1500–1806
- Flag

- The Franconian Circle as at the beginning of the 16th century within the Holy Roman Empire
- Historical era: Early modern period
  - Established: 1500
  - Disestablished: 1806
- Today part of: Germany

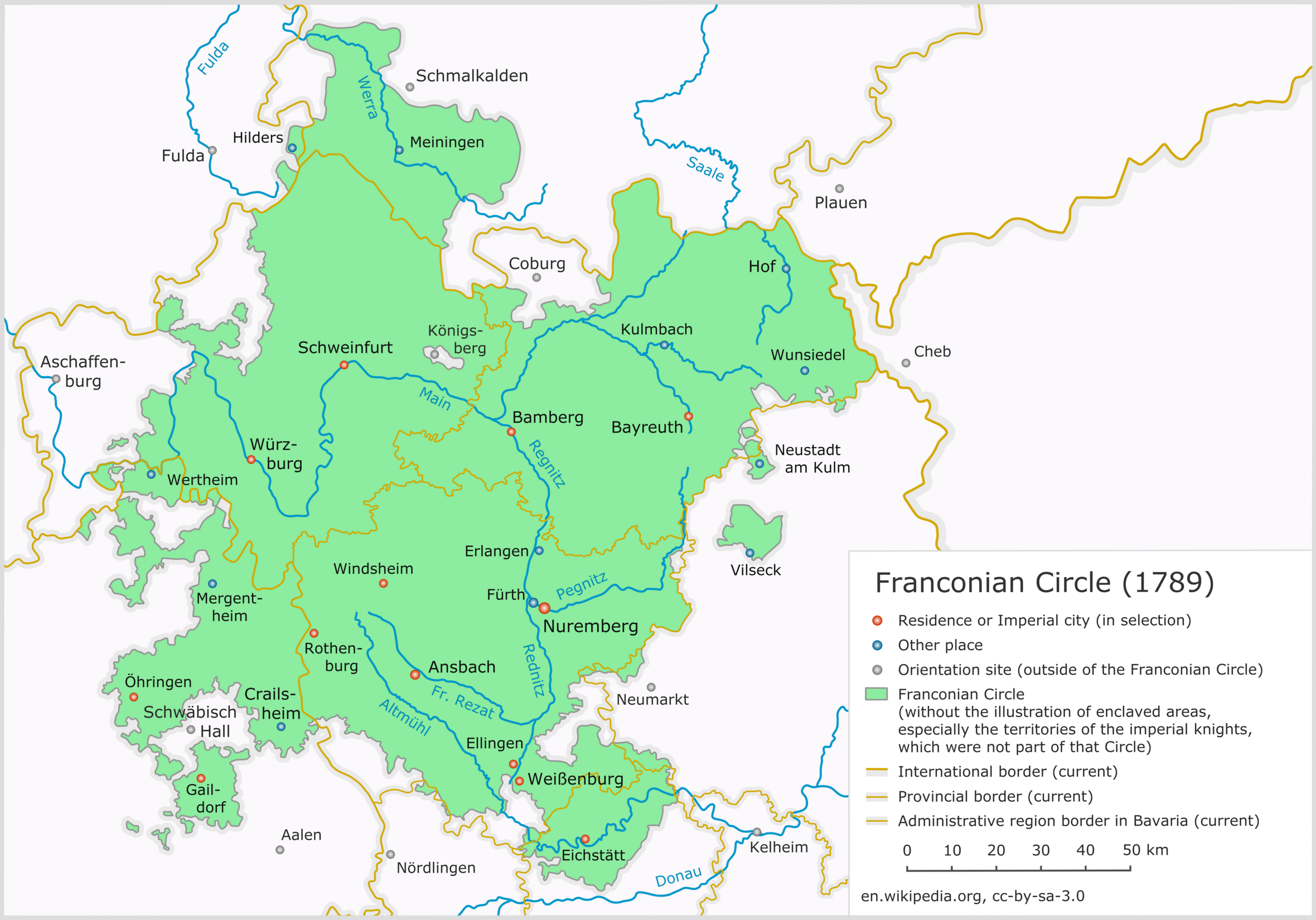
The Franconian Circle as at 1789, before the French Revolutionary Wars and the dissolution of the Holy Roman Empire

The Franconian Circle (German: Fränkischer Reichskreis) was an imperial circle established in 1500 in the centre of the Holy Roman Empire. It comprised the eastern part of the former Franconian stem duchy—roughly corresponding with the present-day Bavarian Regierungsbezirke of Upper, Middle and Lower Franconia—while western Rhenish Franconia belonged to the Upper Rhenish Circle. The title of a "Duke of Franconia" was claimed by the Würzburg bishops.

== Emergence and location ==
As early as the Middle Ages, Franconia had very close links to king and empire. Located between the Rhenish territories of the empire and the Kingdom of Bohemia, Franconia, which included the former Duchy of Franconia, had been one of the centres of empire for a long time.

By order of Emperor Louis of Bavaria, Bamberg, Würzburg, Eichstätt and Fulda with the Hohenzollern Burgraves of Nuremberg, Counts of Henneberg, the Castell and Hohenlohe, the three episcopal cities, and the imperial cities of Nuremberg and Rothenburg united for the first time in a Landfrieden union. But this union (the Franconian Landfrieden) did not last long; it disintegrated in the face of opposition from cities and princes.

On 2 July 1500, at the Reichstag of Augsburg, the Holy Roman Empire of the German Nation was divided into six imperial circles. These first circles were originally numbered, the Franconian Imperial Circle being given the number 1:

The first circle comprises the princes, principalities, states and territories described below, namely the Bishops of Bamberg, Wirtzburg, Eystett, the Margrave of Brandenburg as Burgraves of Nuremberg, the Counts, free and imperial cities, where they are seated and located.

The circles were later given names that corresponded to their geographical location, which gave rise to the name Franconian Circle, which appeared for the first time in 1522. In the late Middle Ages, Franconia was understood to mean the area between the forested uplands of the Spessart and the Steigerwald, mainly comprising the estates of the Bishopric of Würzburg.

The imperial circle extended from the Franconian Saale river to the Altmühl river and encompassed most of the upper and middle reaches of the River Main, roughly corresponding to the modern Bavarian provinces of Upper, Middle and Lower Franconia, but without the Electoral Mainz estates of the Upper Stift around Aschaffenburg.

Using the name Franconia, created an awareness of an inner unity and with an increased sense of togetherness and solidarity which, however, did not exist in the political or sovereign arenas.

== Composition ==
The circle was made up of the following states:

Name	Type of entity	Comments
Ansbach	Margraviate	Established in 1398, held by the House of Hohenzollern, acquired by Prussia in 1791, 28th seat to the Reichstag
Bamberg	Prince-Bishopric	Diocese established in 1007 by King Henry II, Prince-Bishopric since about 1245, 11th seat to the Reichstag
Bayreuth	Margraviate	Established in 1398 at Kulmbach, held by the House of Hohenzollern, personal union with Ansbach from 1769, acquired by Prussia in 1791, 30th seat to the Reichstag
Castell	County	Imperial counts since 1202
Eichstätt	Prince-Bishopric	Established in 741 by Saint Boniface; 17th seat to the Reichstag
Erbach	County	Imperial counts from 1532
Franconia	Teutonic bailiwick	Seated in Bad Mergentheim, 9th seat to the Reichstag
Hausen	Lordship	Held by Bamberg since 1007, condominium with Bayreuth and Nuremberg from 1538
Henneberg	Princely County	Principality since 1310, line extinct in 1583, acquired by Saxe-Weimar and Saxe-Gotha in 1660
Hohenlohe	County	Immediate counts since 1450, raised to principality in 1744
Limpurg	Lordship	Territory around Limpurg Castle near Schwäbisch Hall, held by the Schenken von Limpurg, hereditary cup-bearers of the Empire for the Bohemian kings
Löwenstein	County	Imperial immediacy since 1494, Löwenstein-Wertheim from 1574, raised to principality in 1711
Nuremberg	Imperial City	Reichsfreiheit granted by Frederick II of Hohenstaufen in 1219
Reichelsberg	Lordship	Territory around Reichelsberg Castle near Aub, originally a fiefdom granted by Bamberg to Hohenlohe, since 1401 a fief of Würzburg
Rieneck	County	Territory around Rieneck Castle, established in 1168, claimed as a fief by Mainz from 1366, line extinct in 1559, acquired by the Imperial counts of Nostitz in 1673
Rothenburg ob der Tauber	Imperial City	Reichsfreiheit granted by Rudolph of Habsburg 1274
Schwarzenberg	Lordship	Established in 1429 by the Lords of Seinsheim, territory around Schwarzenberg Castle near Scheinfeld, Imperial county from 1599, principality from 1670
Schweinfurt	Imperial City	Since 1254
Seinsheim	Lordship	Held by the Counts of Schwarzenberg from 1655
Weißenburg	Imperial City	Since 1296
Welzheim	Lordship	Fiefdom of Württemberg, from 1379 to 1713 in possession of the Schenken von Limburg
Wertheim	County	Established in 1132, acquired by Löwenstein in 1574
Wiesentheid	Lordship	Imperial county from 1678, acquired by the Counts of Schönborn in 1701
Windsheim	Imperial City	Since 1248
Würzburg	Prince-Bishopric	Established in 741 by Saint Boniface, prince-bishopric since 1168, titular "Duke in Franconia", 13th seat to the Reichstag

== See also ==
- Flag of Franconia
- History of Franconia

== Sources ==
- The list of states making up the Franconian Circle is based on that in the German Wikipedia article Fränkischer Reichskreis.
