= Johann Salver =

German engraver

Johann Salver (c. 1670–1738) was a German copper engraver from the town of Forchheim, and the father of Johann Octavian Salver.

Salver was the author of Die Gross und Landmeister des Deutschen Ordens containing 51 plates, published in Würzburg in 1716, and the series on the Würzburg prince-bishops titled Geschicht-Schreiber von dem Bischoffthum Wirtzburg, published in 1713.
