= Rosenberg Fortress =

Fortress in Germany

- Festung Rosenberg
- Kronach, Germany
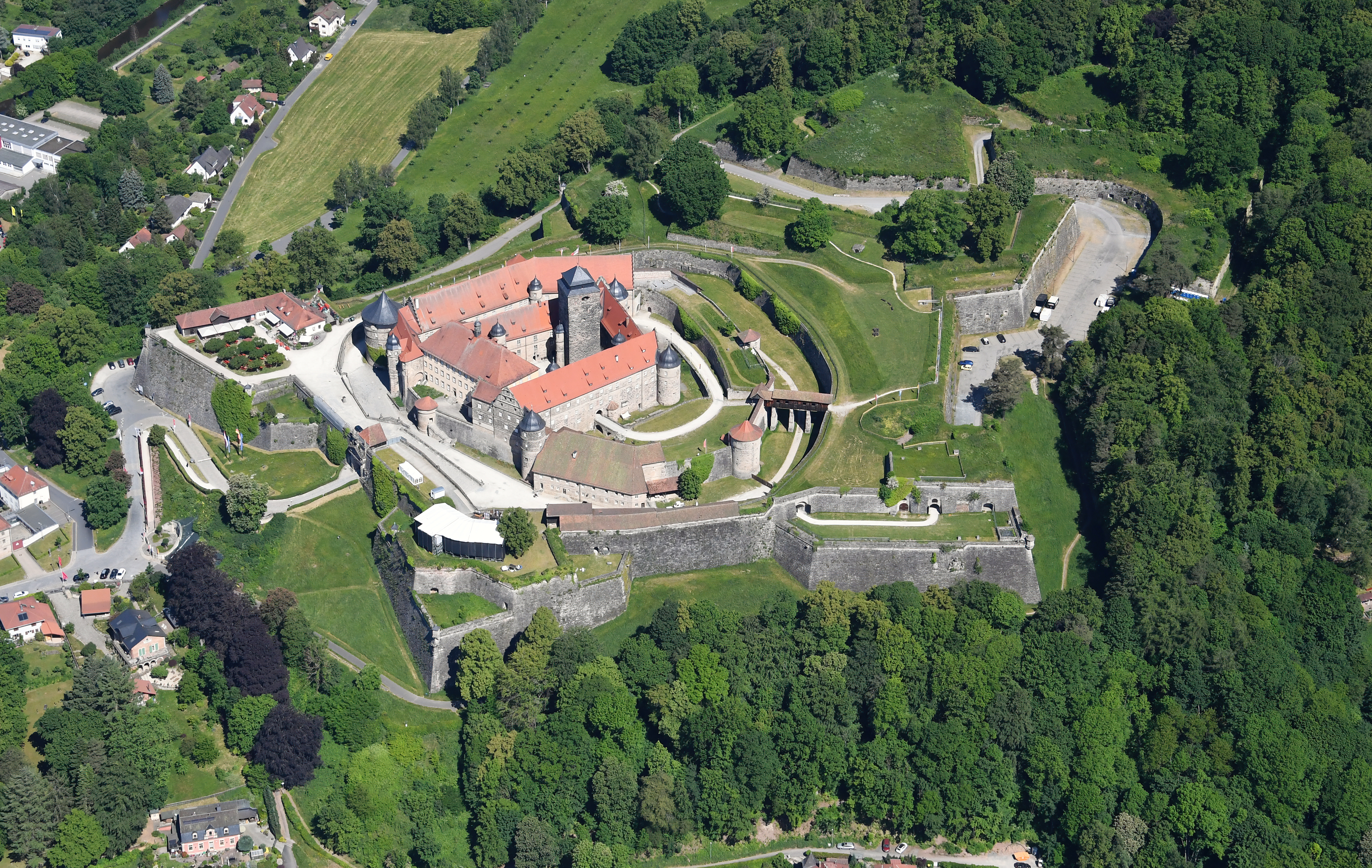
- Fortress Rosenberg

Site information
- Type: Fortress
- Owner: Kronach
- Open to the public: Yes
- Condition: Almost entirely intact

Location
- Coordinates: 50.2444°N 11.3276°E

Site history
- Built: 13th to 18th century
- Built by: Prince-Bishops of Bamberg

Rosenberg Fortress (German: Festung Rosenberg) is a fortress situated on a hill overlooking Kronach, a town in the Upper Franconia region of Bavaria, Germany. It is one of the largest and best-preserved in Bavaria, having never been captured by force. Originating as a medieval hill castle, it was transformed into a massive baroque fortress complex during the early modern period, being one of the two fortresses of the Prince-Bishopric of Bamberg (the other one being the now-defunct Forchheim Fortress). Its military use continued until the end of World War II. Including its moats and ravelins, the fortress covers an area of circa 8.5 hectares (19.8 acres).

== Geography ==
The fortress was built on the 378-meter-high Rosenberg, with a strategically excellent position overlooking Kronach. With control over the confluence of the Kronach, Haßlach, and Rodach rivers, the fortress could control trade routes into the Franconian Forest and Thuringia.

== History ==
=== Under the Prince-Bishopric of Bamberg ===
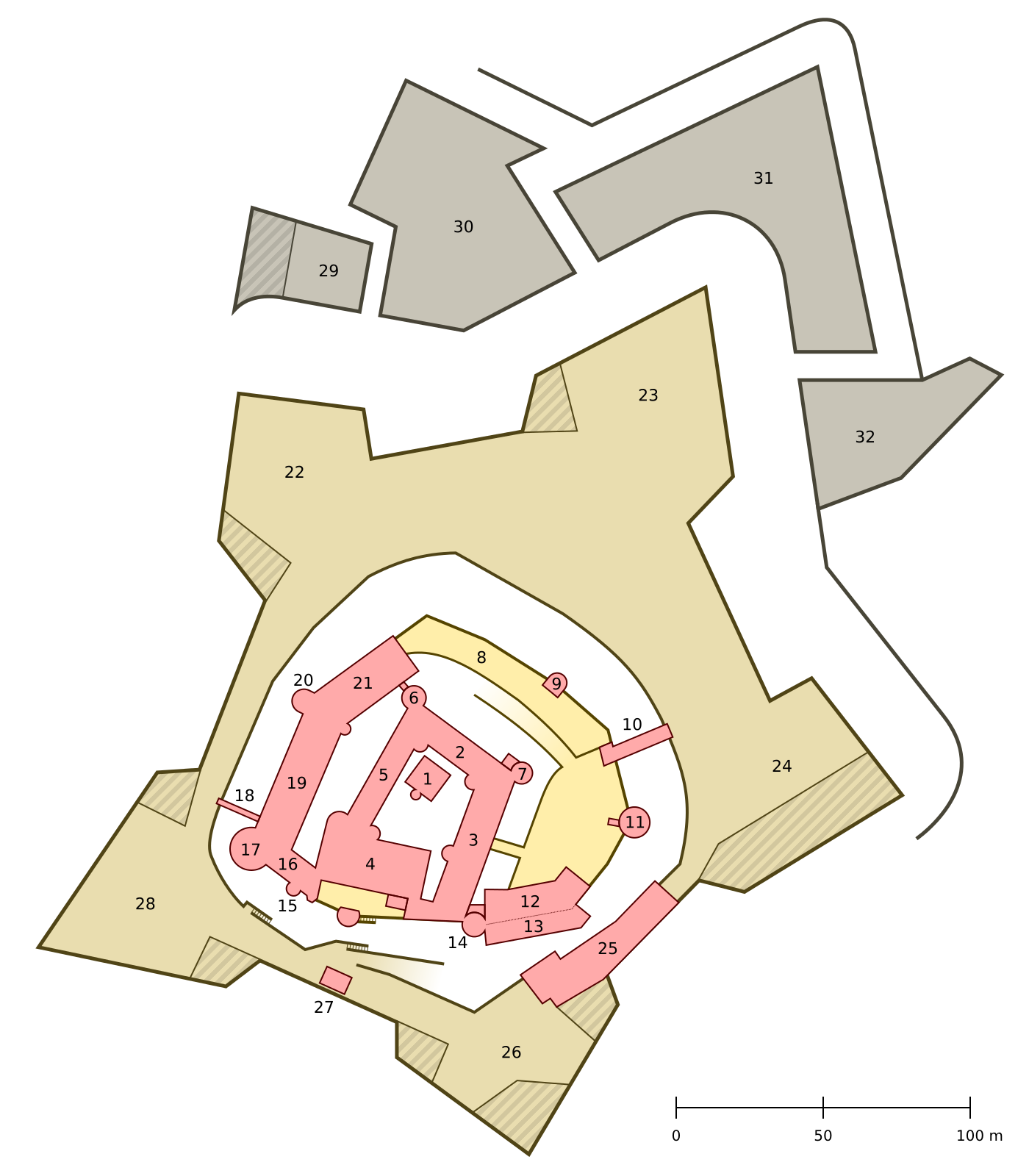
A diagram of the Fortress

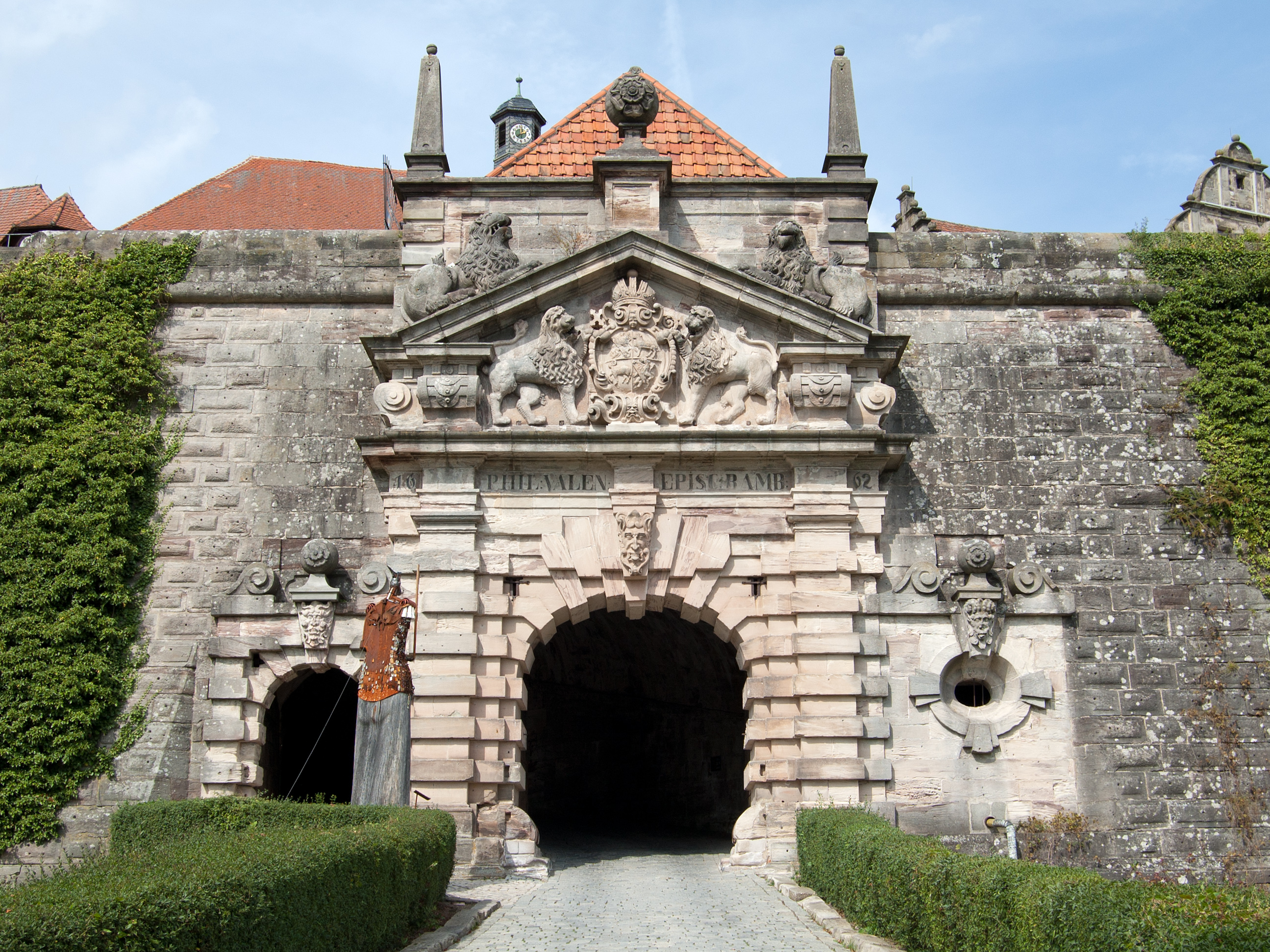
The main gate of Rosenberg Fortress

What became Rosenberg Fortress was probably founded by Otto of Bamberg. He received Kronach and the surrounding area, the Praedium Crana, in 1122 as a gift from Henry V, Holy Roman Emperor, in thanks for the Otto's participation in the Concordat of Worms. The records of Michaelsberg Abbey in Bamberg state that Otto had a "stone house and a tower" erected at Kronach in 1130. The probable site of this construction was uncovered by archeologists in 1989, who discovered the foundations of a tower house dated to the 12th century about three kilometers north of the current town center.

Rosenberg Fortress was first mentioned by name in a 1249 letter of Pope Innocent IV, who had been called on to mediate a dispute between Otto II von Schaumberg and Bishop Henry I von Bilversheim, who had pledged the town and fortress to von Schaumberg. In the 1260 treaty returning Kronach to Bamberg, the "castrum in Ronssenberg" was mentioned again. In the following two centuries, the fortress continuously grew in order to keep up with military development, at the end of the 15th Century Prince-Bishop Philipp von Henneberg erected the still-extant second curtain wall of the fortress.

During the German Peasants' War in 1525, the Fortress temporarily came under the control of the peasants, after the Steward and Town Council decided to surrender the town and fortress to the peasant host. After the Swabian League expelled the peasants from Kronach, Prince-Bishop Weigand of Redwitz had four citizens executed and the town fined for its surrender.

Only three decades later, during the Second Margrave War, Albert Alcibiades, Margrave of Brandenburg-Kulmbach marched on Kronach and mandated its surrender. However, due to the insufficient size of his army, Alcibiades was unable to effectively put the heavily fortified town or castle under siege and retreated.

After the war ended, it was decided that the fortress was insufficiently fortified, so Prince-Bishop Veit von Würzburg oversaw the construction of a third layer of fortification consisting of four mostly wood and earth bastions. Veit also had a renaissance-style palace built inside the castle, with the hope that Kronach could become the Prince-Bishopric's third residence city, after Bamberg and Forchheim. This hope never materialized, however, starting in the early 17th century, Kronach became the refuge of choice for the Prince-Bishops, their treasures, and their archives at times when Bamberg was threatened by war. Christoph Franz von Buseck, the last Prince-Bishop of Bamberg, sought refuge at Kronach before his final deposition in 1802.

The Thirty Years' War provided the newly renovated fortress with its first great test. For two years, from 1632 to 1634, Kronach was placed under siege and subjected to countless attacks by the marauding Swedish Army and its German allies, including Saxony-Coburg and Bayreuth. The town and fortress famously remained uncaptured, largely owing to the efforts of Kronach's women, who halted a Swedish breach of the city walls with boiling liquids. The Swedish army was also held off at the fortress' bastions and never breached the inner layers of the fortress.

Although the defense of Kronach was successful, its siege demonstrated that the town and fortress' defenses were insufficient in the face of new military developments. After the Swedes were no longer an imminent threat, renovations started, overseen by Prince-Bishop Philipp Valentin Voit von Rieneck. Starting in the second half of the 17th century, the existing bastions were replaced with five baroque stone bastions, and a system of four ravelins was built at the north end of the fortress. Additional earthworks and adits were also constructed north of the bastions.

The modernization measures were tested in 1759 during the Seven Years' War, when Prussian Major General Gottfried von Knobloch attempted to shell Kronach into submission. Situated on the Kreuzberg hill east of the town, Knobloch's artillery proved too weak to deal real damage to the town, and could barely reach the fortress. However, the fortress' artillery could reach the Prussian positions, forcing von Knobloch to give up the bombardment and continue southwards.

=== Under Bavaria ===
Following the secularization of the Prince-Bishopric of Bamberg in 1803, Kronach became part of the Electorate, later Kingdom, of Bavaria. Drastic transformations in the nature of warfare, namely the transition to maneuver warfare and ever-improving artillery technology made the fortress' fortifications irrelevant and cumbersome. Most of the fortress' inventory, including its cannons, were sold to Würzburg in 1805.

In 1806, the fortress was a base for Napoleon Bonaparte's campaign against Prussia. The French had 14 corner bartizans on the fortress' bastions demolished, that they might not become aiming points for artillery if the French forced to fall back to the fortress. These were mostly reconstructed in the 20th century. In the following decades, the fortress was threatened several times, the last time in 1866 during the Austro-Prussian War, however, it was never again the site of any major engagements.

Starting in 1867, the fortress was made a military prison holding 100 men. Among others, Catholic political prisoners opposing Bavarian unification with Prussia were held there, including Johann Baptist Sigl. These prisoners were pardoned by Ludwig II in 1870, so that the fortress could be used to hold French Prisoners of War from the Franco-Prussian War. After the war, the prison closed in 1875 for lack of prisoners. The town of Kronach purchased the fortress in 1888 for 32,000 Mark, saving it from abandonment and possible slighting.

During World War I, the fortress was made a Prisoner-of-War Camp for captured officers. In its four years of existence, it housed hundreds of allied prisoners from France, Russia, the United Kingdom, and Belgium. The prisoners were treated fairly well, and allowed to take walks outside of the fortress walls if they promised not to attempt escape. Among the prisoners was a young Charles de Gaulle, who was interned there from 20 July to 21 November 1917. After repeated escape attempts, breaches of his promise, de Gaulle was transferred to Ingolstadt Fortress. After the POW Camp was closed in 1918, the mayor and higher town officials lived at the fortress.

During World War II, the fortress became part of a forced-labor camp for Polish and Soviet prisoners, who lived there and were made to work at the Rosenthal Porcelain factory nearby. Towards the end of the war, the fortress was used as a secret facility for the production of Messerschmitt Me 163 parts. Organisation Todt built production halls into casemates and bastions, however, these were never completed. After the end of the war, the fortress hosted refugees.

Fortress Rosenberg is a listed building, and its maintenance is mostly conducted, at great expense, by the town of Kronach. A Bavarian state-sponsored renovation was completed in 2015. Since 1983, the south wing of the fortress has hosted the Franconian Gallery (Fränkische Galerie), a branch museum of the Bavarian National Museum. The gallery mainly holds Franconian art from the 13th to the 16th century, including works by masters such as Veit Stoss, Adam Kraft, Tilman Riemenschneider, and especially Kronach's native son Lucas Cranach the Elder. The fortress also hosts the Kronach Festival, where works of theater are presented on an open-air stage on the St. Heinrich-Bastion, and Die Festung Rockt, a rock festival in the former moat. Since 2019, the fortress has housed the JUFA Hotel Kronach in its north wing.
