= Weigand of Redwitz =

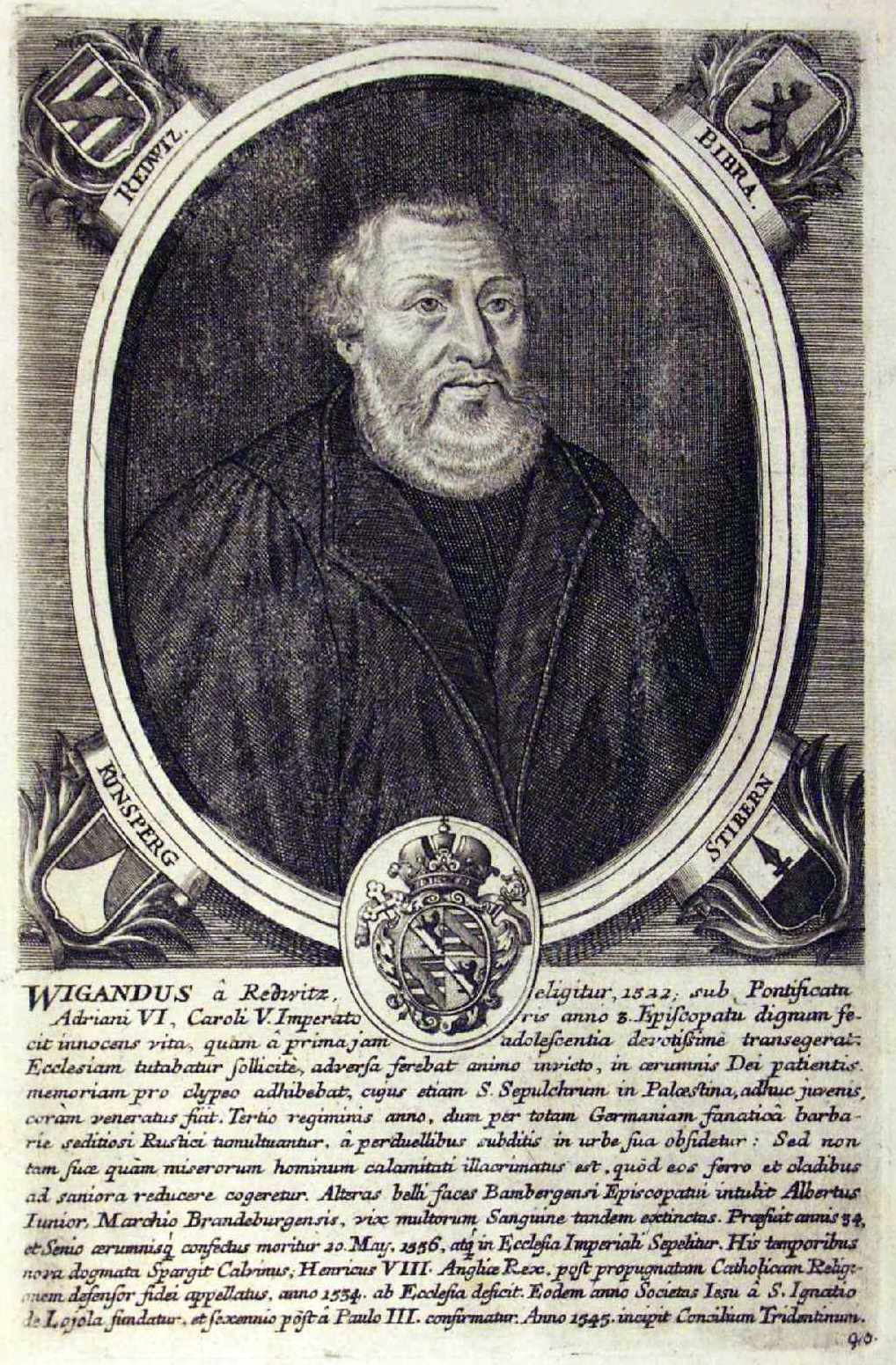
- Weigand of Redwitz, copper engraving by Johann Salver
- Born: 1476; Tüschnitz, now part of Küps
- Died: 20 May 1556; Kronach
- Buried: Bamberg Cathedral
- Noble family: Redwitz
- Father: Henry of Redwitz at Theisenort and Tüschnitz
- Mother: Agatha of Bibra

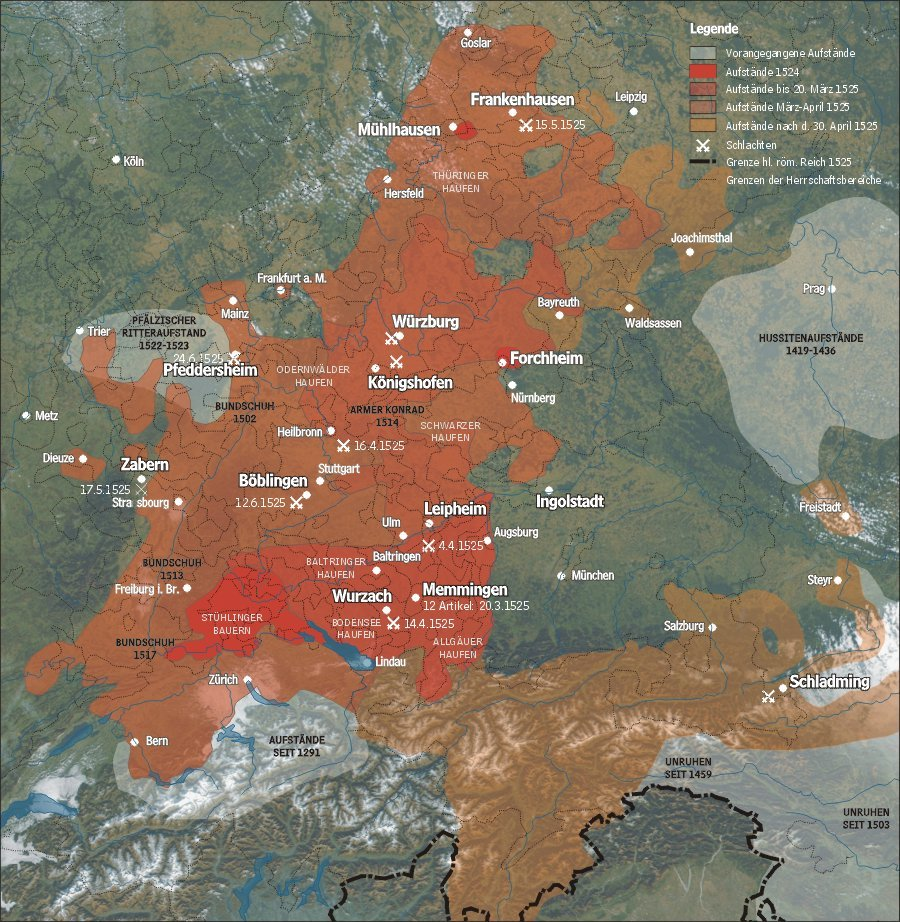
Extent of the revolts during the German Peasants' War

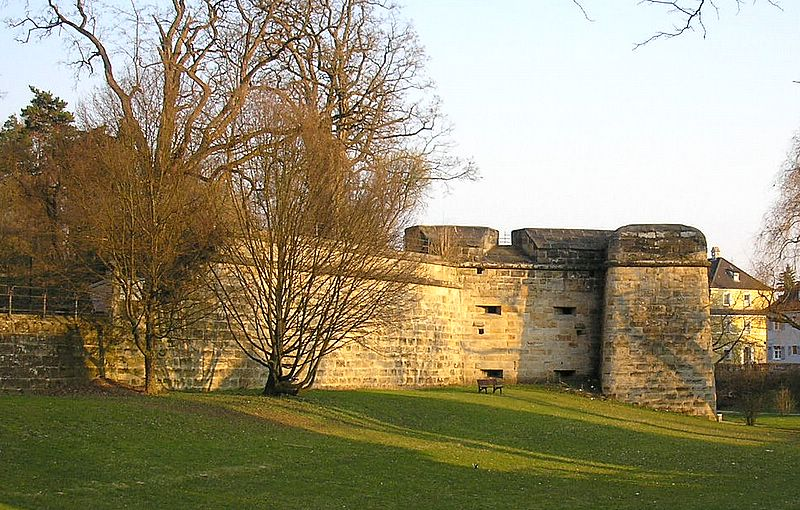
St. Veit Bastion of the Forchheim Fortress from the north

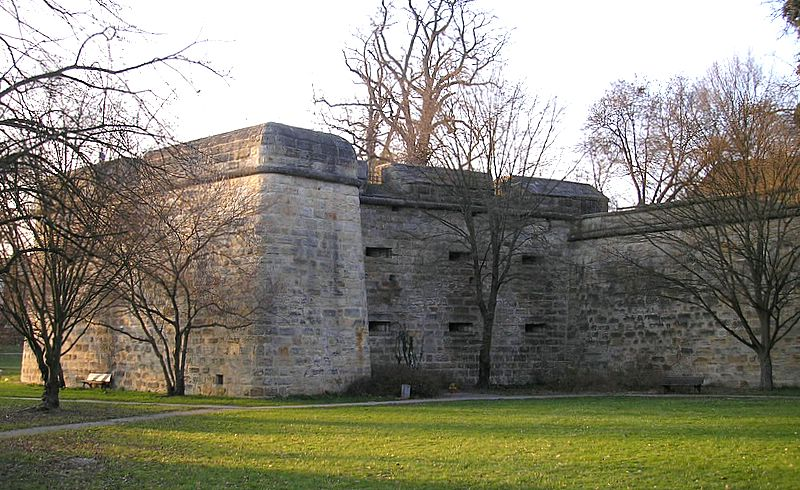
St. Veit Bastion from the south

Weigand of Redwitz (1476 in Tüschnitz, now part of Küps – 20 May 1556 in Kronach) was Prince-Bishop of Bamberg from 1522 until his death.

== Background ==
Weigand of Redwitz was a member of the Franconian Redwitz family. The Redwitzes were Imperial Knights; the family was named after Redwitz an der Rodach, a village in Lichtenfels district in Upper Franconia. Weigand was a son of Henry of Redwitz at Theisenort and Tüschnitz and his wife, Agatha of Bibra. His relative Catherine II of Redwitz (d. 1560) was Abbess of Obermünster Abbey in Regensburg from 1533 to 1536.

== Life ==
Weigand of Redwitz became a canon in Bamberg in 1490. He made a pilgrimage to Jerusalem.

In 1520, he was the senior pastor of Kronach. Among his congregation was the reformer Johannes Grau, who had to flee to Wittenberg after he married the daughter of a citizen of Kronach. During his time as bishop, Weigand acted against Luther's followers and removed Lutheran clergy from office. However, under the restraining influence of his veteran advisor John of Schwarzenberg, he was less radical than some of the people who had elected him would have liked.

At the time Weigand was appointed bishop, Adrian VI was Pope and Charles V was Emperor. During his reign, the Peasants' War raged in the area. Over 70 manors and several monasteries were destroyed. Weigand attempted to resolve the conflict diplomatically. When military intervention appeared unavoidable, he turned to the Swabian League. The cathedral chapter also favoured intervention by the Swabian League. When the troubles began, the chapter had more rights than ever before, but now existential questions about their position were being posed. Although some of the canons may have sympathized with the Protestant faith, the demands of the peasant, which implied disempowering the canons, met with fierce resistance. The commander of the League's forces, Georg, Truchsess von Waldburg, was a loyal, but also ruthless military leader. Weigand's supporters were rewarded with properties confiscated from wealthy families in Bamberg. After the revolt was suppressed, Weigand, unlike some other feudal rulers, did not impose draconian punishments on the rebels. However, some rebel leaders were beheaded in the marketplace.

He pledged Veldenstein Castle to the Burgraviate of Nuremberg.

During the Second Margrave War, near the end of his reign, the Protestant Margrave Albert III Alcibiades of Brandenburg-Kulmbach invaded his territory. Weigand was not prepared and had to give in to the Margrave's excessive demands. He ceded almost half of his territory. To secure his claims, Albert occupied the key central cities Forchheim and Bamberg. Albert Alcibiades had made many enemies with his bellicose behaviour and was defeated in 1553. He died in exile in 1557.

== Coat of arms ==
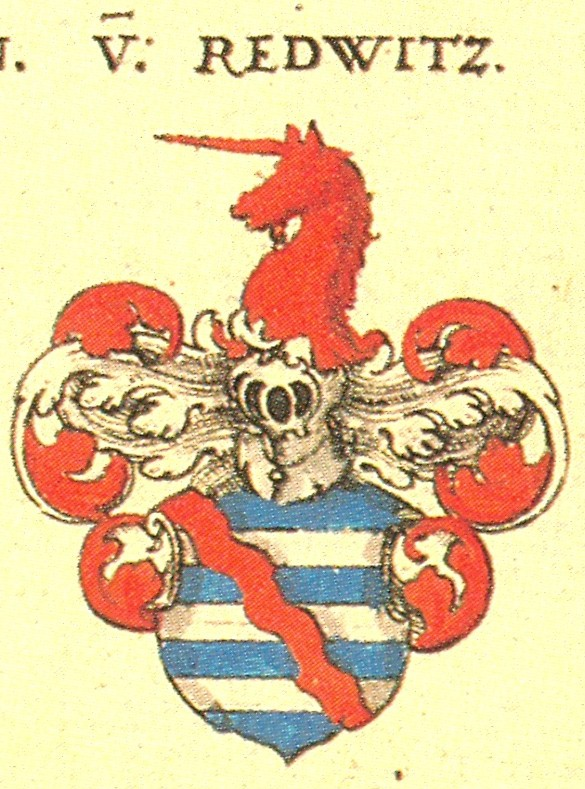
Coat of arms of the Redwitz family. As bishop, Wiegand used these arms as an element in a quartered arms

Wiegand's coat of arms were quartered. The second and third field show the Redwitz family coat of arms. According to Siebmachers Wappenbuch, this consisted of a blue field with three silver bars, covered by a red diagonal bar. The other two quarters show the black lion of Bamberg, topped with a silver diagonal bar on golden ground.

Weigand's coat of arms can be found attached to the St. Veit Bastion of Forchheim Fortress. There are also several copies on the core castle of Rosenberg Fortress in Kronach, which was expanded by Weigand.

== Grave monument in Michaelsberg Abbey ==
Weigand was buried in the Bamberg Cathedral. However, when this cathedral was restored, his grave monument was moved to the left aisle of the church of Michaelsberg Abbey, to achieve a greater stylistic unity in the Romanesque cathedral. The monument was designed by Hans Polster.

== Footnotes ==
Weigand of Redwitz Redwitz Born: 1476 Died: 20 May 1556
Preceded by George III Schenk of Limpurg	Bishop of Bamberg; 1522-1556	Succeeded by George IV Fuchs of Rügheim
