= Georg Schenk von Limpurg =

German Catholic bishop (1470–1522)

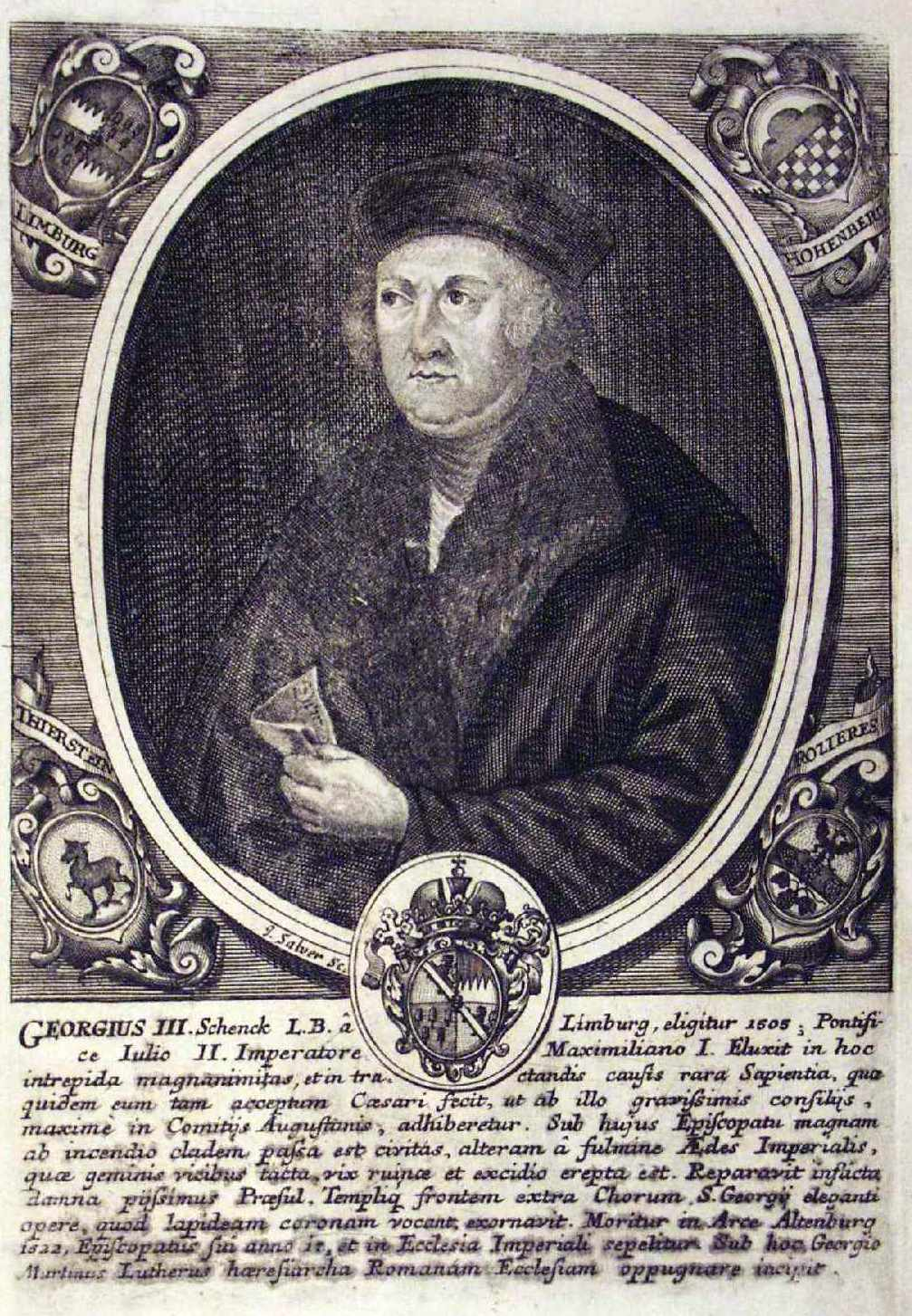
Engraving of Georg Schenk von Limpurg by Johann Salver.

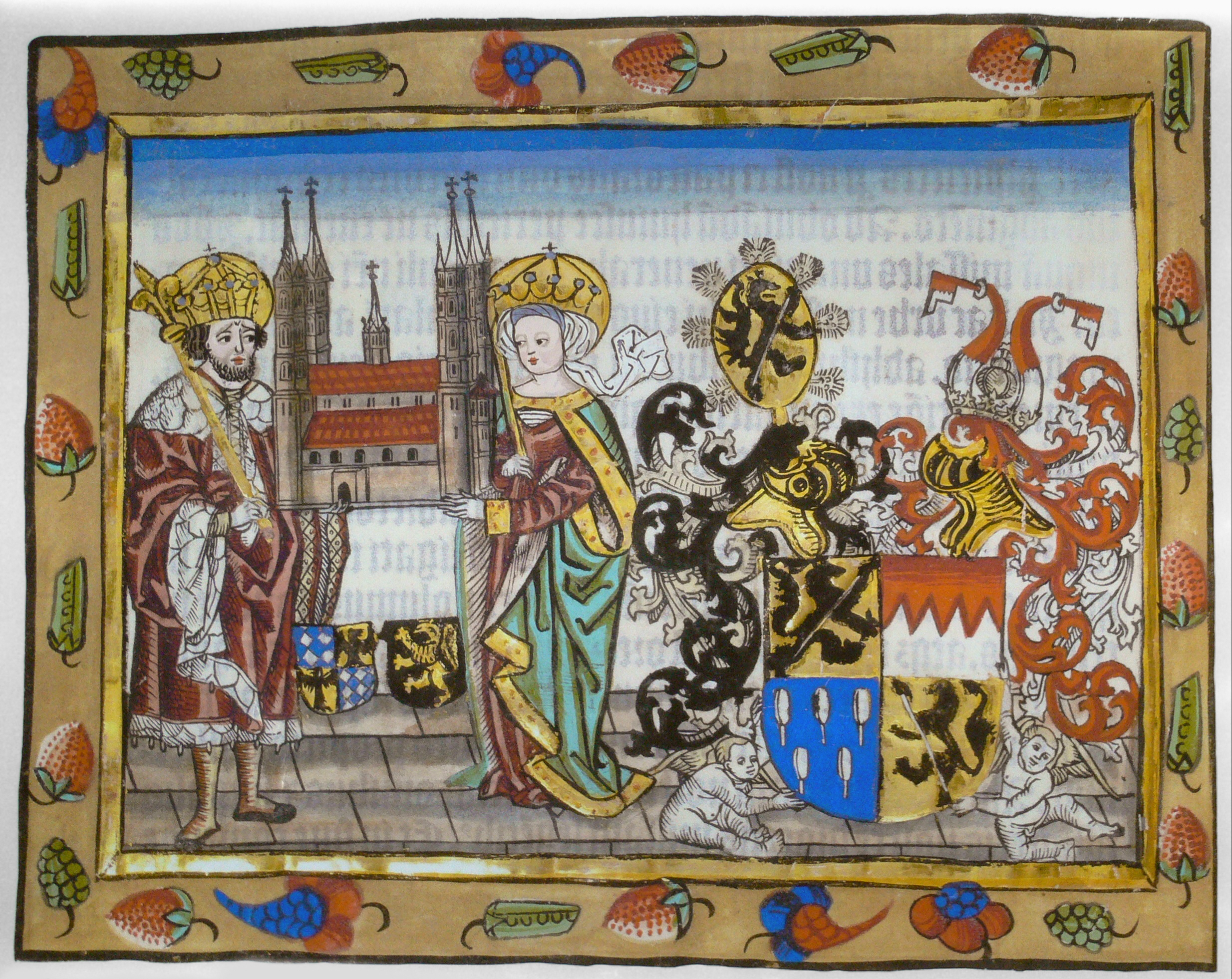
Henry II, Holy Roman Emperor and Cunigunde of Luxembourg pictured with Bamberg Cathedral and the coat of arms of Georg Schenk von Limpurg in the Bamberger Missale, 1507.

Georg Schenk von Limpurg (1470–1522) was the Prince-Bishop of Bamberg from 1505 to 1522.

== Biography ==
Georg Schenk von Limpurg was born in Obersontheim in 1470.

He was elected Prince-Bishop of Bamberg on 13 February 1505, with Pope Julius II confirming his appointment on 18 April 1505. He was consecrated as a bishop by Kaspar Preiel, auxiliary bishop of Bamberg, on 20 October 1505.

In 1507, he appointed Johann of Schwarzenberg to reform the law of Bamberg; Johann of Schwarzenberg drafted the Halsgerichtsordnung (Procedure for the judgment of capital crimes) of Bamberg (also known as the Bambergensis), which would later form the basis of the Constitutio Criminalis Carolina (1530–32).

Schenk von Limpurg was a trusted adviser of Maximilian I, Holy Roman Emperor, particularly at the 1518 Imperial Diet held in Augsburg, where the major topic of discussion was Martin Luther.

He died in Altenburg, Bamberg, on 31 May 1522. He is buried in Bamberg Cathedral, with a funerary monument by Loy Hering.

== Cultural Depictions ==
Georg Schenk von Limpurg is the Bishop of Bamberg who was a character in Johann Wolfgang von Goethe's play Götz von Berlichingen (1773).

Catholic Church titles
Preceded by Georg Marschalk von Ebnet	Prince-Bishop of Bamberg; 1505–1522	Succeeded by Weigand von Redwitz
