= Forchheim Castle =

- Kaiserpfalz
- Forchheim
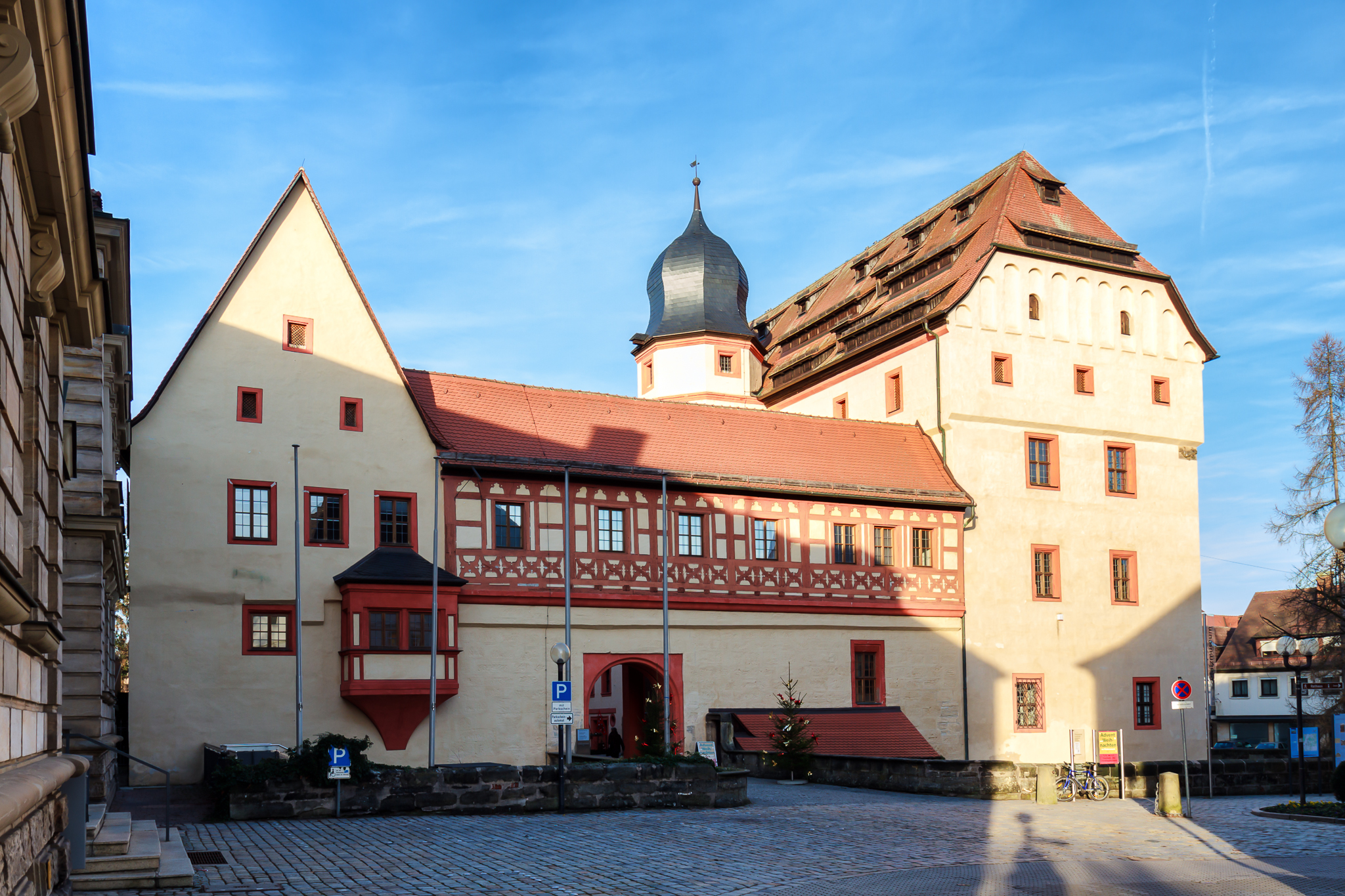
- Front view of the castle

Site information
- Type: Urban site
- Code: DE-BY
- Condition: burgstall (no above-ground ruins)

Location
- Coordinates: 49°43′13″N 11°03′20″E
- Height: Height missing, see template documentation

Site history
- Built: 14th century

The castle in Forchheim (German: Burg in Forchheim), also referred to as a royal palace or Kaiserpfalz, was an important urban castle under the bishops of Bamberg in the town of Forchheim in the south German state of Bavaria. The castle was built in the late 14th century. After comprehensive archaeological and architectural-historical investigation it has become one of the best researched castles of this period in Central Europe. Today it houses the Archaeological Museum of Upper Franconia.

The oldest part of the castle is in the west wing where the cabinet (Kemenate) of the Schultheiß has survived, a room which was built onto the old town wall in 1339.

== Site of the early medieval Kaiserpfalz? ==
From the 9th to the early 11th centuries there was a Frankish royal court (Königshof) and a palace (Pfalz) in Forchheim (see the history of Forchheim). Its exact location is, however, not known. In the late 19th century it was thought to be on the site of the episcopal urban castle, which was also referred to as the Pfalz ("palace") or Kaiserpfalz ("imperial palace"). However, archaeological investigations carried out during the renovation of the castle from 1998 to 2004 uncovered no remains of an early medieval settlement at all. Nevertheless, even in recent literature by Tillman Kohnert (2008), the Pfalz is still seen as the direct predecessor to the episcopal castle. And the castle still retains the name of Kaiserpfalz, a name which has been adopted for decades and is used as the official name of the castle.

== The castle around 1400 ==
From the late 14th century the bishops of Bamberg, especially Bishop Lambert of Buren, built an urban castle that became their most important residence outside of the immunity of Bamberg Cathedral. The centrepiece of the castle is the so-called Great Cabinet (Große Kemenate), the former residence, which was built in the east of the castle from 1391. In the cabinet an extensive stone chamber forced-air heating system has survived. Of great art-historical significance are the Gothic murals, some of which are even by Bohemian masters.

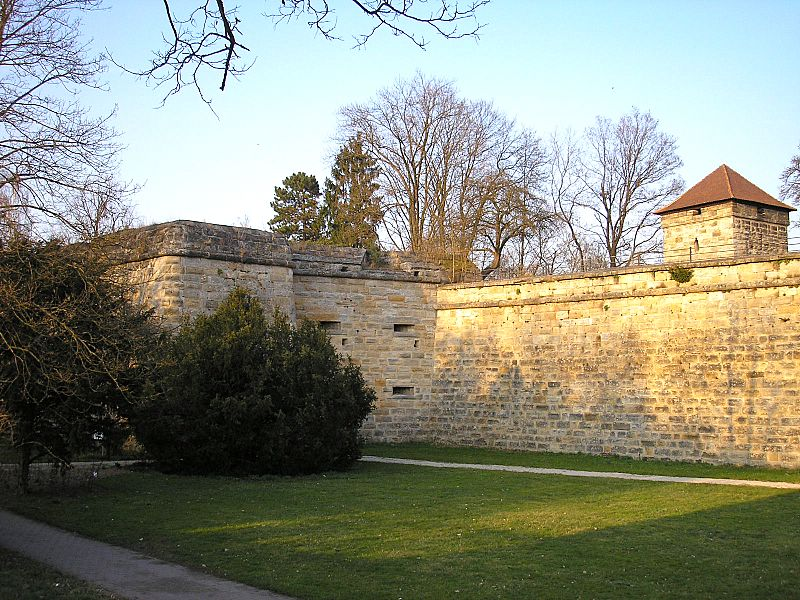
The bastion by the Saltor Tower, northwest of the castle. In the background is the Saltor Tower, a relic of the medieval town fortifications

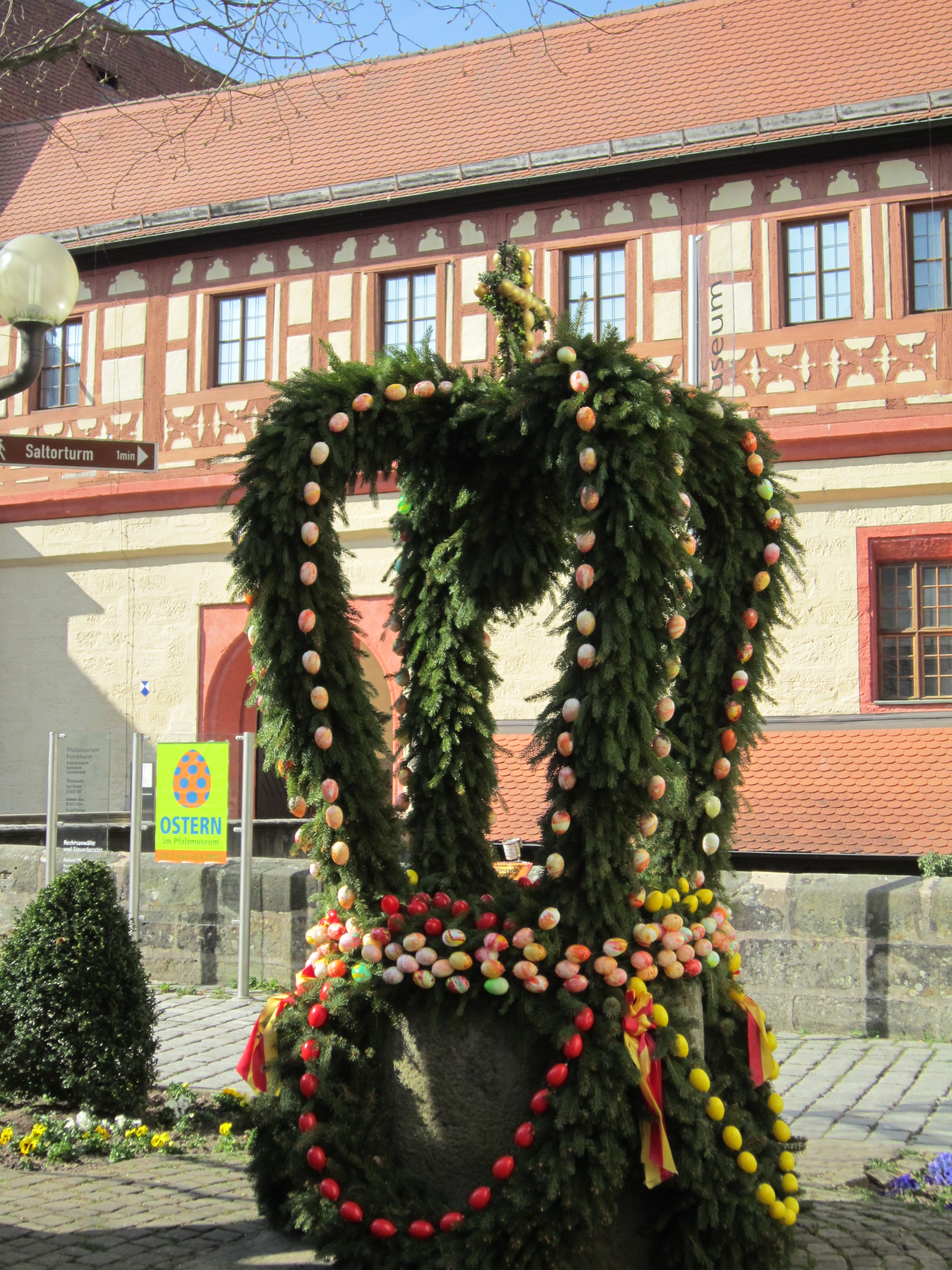
An Osterbrunnen (Easter Fountain) in front of the castle

== Description ==
=== Exterior ===
The almost square castle site is surrounded by moats. Until around 1550 the fortress at the northwest corner of the town was incorporated into the town fortifications. North of the castle, is the only surviving medieval town gate, the Saltor Tower (Saltorturm). In the 16th century a modern bastioned fortification, based on Italian designs, was constructed in front of the remains of the medieval town wall. North and west of the castle district, two large casemated "Old Italian" bastions escaped the fate of demolition that other parts of Forchheim Fortress suffered in the 19th and early 20th centuries.

Large parts of the main house and the courtyard buildings go back to the 14th century. The eastern part of the main house is joined to the courtyard buildings on the west side by walls and timber-framed passageways. The two upper storeys of the northwest wing have also been executed in a simple, timber-framed style as far as the castle courtyard.

In the middle of the 16th century the urban castle was remodelled. It was at that time that the picturesque, timber-framed walkways on the curtain walls were constructed. In 1603 work began on building an octagonal staircase tower in front of the four-storey main house. The mighty half-hipped roof of the main house dates to the 18th century. Originally the east wing was covered by a gable roof with crow-stepped gables. Since 1768–69 a sandstone bridge has spanned the moat in front of the gateway on the south side. Previously access had been protected by a drawbridge. Next to it, a rectangular Renaissance oriel with a shed roof enhances the architectural impression. The rather austere south front of the ensemble is brought to life mainly by the timber framing (Sichtfachwerk) above the gateway. A typical Franconian motif is the frieze made of numerous, small curved St. Andrew's crosses underneath the window area.

On the east façade of the main wing are three reliefs depicting coats of arms. On the second storey is the official coat of arms of Prince-Bishop John Philip of Gebsattel. The third storey bears the coat of arms of Bishop Lamprecht of Brunn and the Hochstift. A high medieval sculpture of a basilisk has been engraved into the south wall; it has been dated to the 12th century.

The addition of a modern, steel and glass staircase and lift tower in the north of the east wing has been highly controversial. This feature was needed to turn the castle into a museum.

=== Interior rooms ===
==== East Wing ====
The East Wing of the castle is divided into two parts by a transverse wall running the width of the building. The north part is somewhat larger than the south part. The barrel-roofed cellar goes back to the 14th century. The ceilings of the two halls on the ground floor are borne on sandstone columns.

The flat ceiling of the north room rests on a round column and a wooden beam. The south part was vaulted later, resulting in a twin-aisled hall comprising four bays that are covered by cross vaults. In former times a passageway led from here to St. Mary's Chapel. On the walls of the hall fragments of fresco-secco (painting on dry plaster) from the period around 1400 have survived, which are stylistically related to contemporary Bohemian art. A fragment shows the Biblical and historical figure of King David of ancient Israel. Like the murals in the other halls these paintings are among the most important Gothic murals in South Germany.

The chapel was originally located in the southern part of the first floor. The vaulting was done in the early modern period; and the hall was divided by an internal dividing wall. The murals of the old chapel have survived and indicate its original function and arrangement. It includes depictions of the prophets, the Adoration of the Magi, the Annunciation and the Last Judgement. Two paintings with secular content have been interpreted by H. Kehrer as referring to the weak king, Wenceslaus. The paintings were clearly done by different masters. The Adoration of the Magi, again, appears to be derived from the field of Bohemian art. The Last Judgement, by contrast, is in the latest Forchheim style, which was derived from the Nuremberg art of the early 15th century. The northern hall, like that on the ground floor, is covered by a flat ceiling which, however, rests on wooden beams.

On the second floor of the northern end of the wing is also a twin-aisled, flat-ceiling hall with a wooden centre beam. The architectural paintings were done by Jakob Ziegler in the years 1559–60. The south room is likewise a two-aisled hall. The flat ceiling is supported on an octagonal centre frame. The murals, of various themes, were also created by Jakob Ziegler. One of the paintings shows Saints Henry II and Cunigunde with the model of Bamberg Cathedral (drawn in 1599, south wall).

The third floor was conceived as a storage area and currently serves as a museum depot. The old staircase tower hides a stone circular staircase which opens into the northern part of the east wing.

==== West Wing ====
The West Wing, the former side wing, acts as offices for the castle museums. No significant historical interior features have survived here.

== Literature ==
- Paul Oesterreicher: Geschichtliche Darstellung des alten Königshofes Forchheim - nebst einem Verzeichnisse aller bekannten Königshöfe (Neue Beiträge zur Geschichte, 2). Bamberg, 1824
- Hugo Kehrer: Die gotischen Wandmalereien in der Kaiser-Pfalz zu Forchheim - ein Beitrag zur Ursprungsfrage der fränkischen Malerei (Bayerische Akademie der Wissenschaften. Philosophisch-Historische Klasse: Abhandlungen, 26,3). Munich, 1912
- Katharina Sitzmann: Stadt Forchheim (Denkmäler in Bayern, Vol. IV.53/1). Schnell & Steiner, Munich, Zurich, 1989, ISBN 3-7954-1006-1
- Daniel Burger: Burg und Festung Forchheim (Burgen, Schlösser und Wehrbauten in Mitteleuropa, 19). Regensburg, Schnell & Steiner, 2004, ISBN 3-7954-1658-2
- Die Wandmalereien in der Kaiserpfalz Forchheim. Forchheim, Förderkreis Kaiserpfalz, 2007, ISBN 978-3-00-020231-5
- Tillman Kohnert: Die Forchheimer Burg genannt Pfalz. Geschichte und Baugeschichte einer fürstbischöflich-bambergischen Stadtburg (Schriften des Deutschen Burgenmuseum Bd. 4). Imhof-Verlag, Petersberg 2008, ISBN 978-3-86568-334-2
