= Johann of Schwarzenberg =

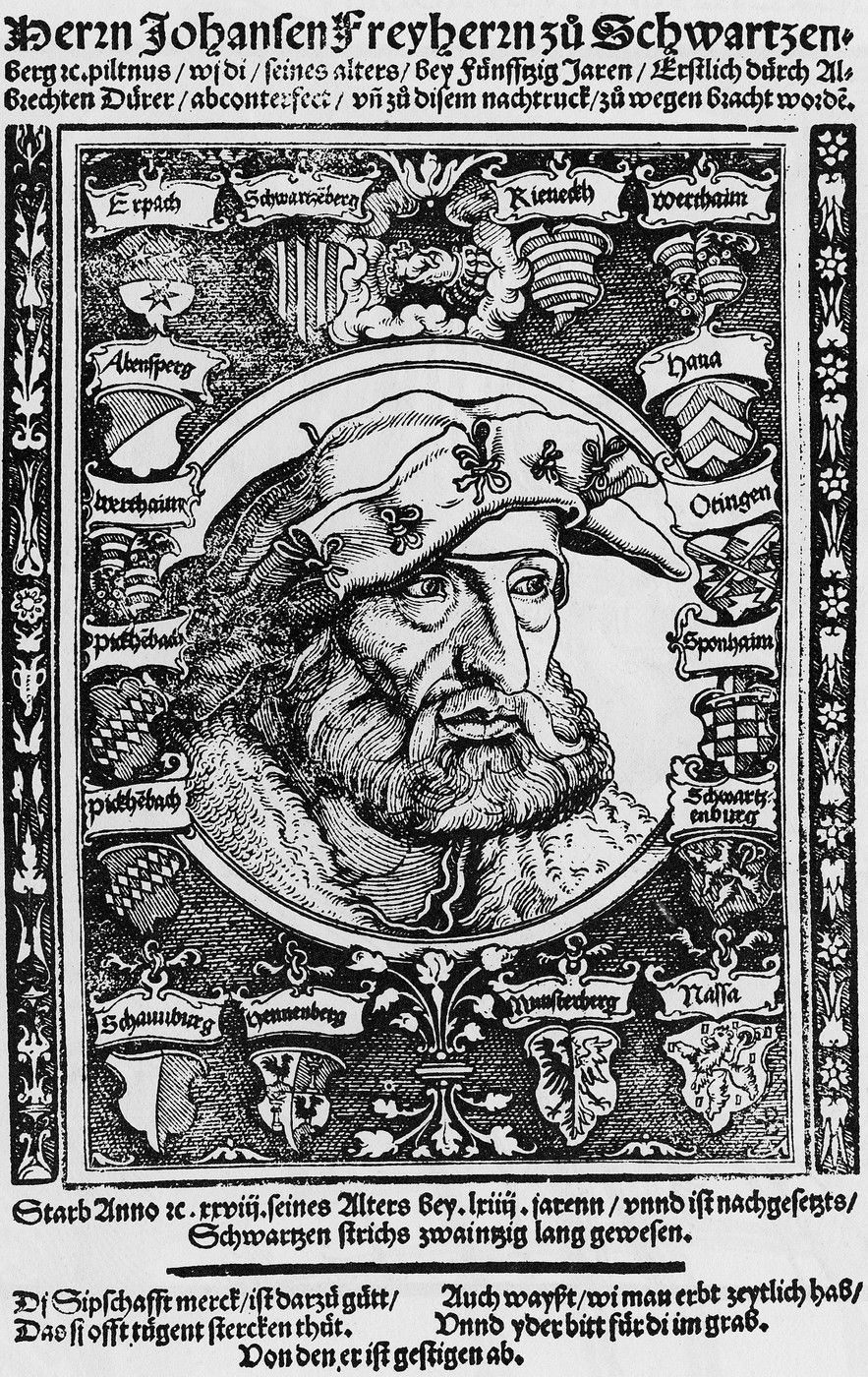
Johann Schwarzenberg. Albrecht Dürer.

Johann of Schwarzenberg (25 December 1463 – 21 October 1528) (also Johann, Freiherr von Schwarzenberg and Hohenlandsberg) was a German moralist and reformer who, as judge of the episcopal court at Bamberg, introduced a new code of evidence which amended the procedure then prevalent in Europe by securing for the accused a more impartial hearing.

== Life ==
In 1507, at the direction of the Prince-Bishop of Bamberg, Georg Schenk von Limpurg, Schwarzenberg drew up the Halsgerichtsordnung (Procedure for the judgment of capital crimes) of Bamberg (also known as the Bambergensis). It was based on the humanistic school of Roman law, and it was in turn the basis for the Constitutio Criminalis Carolina, drafted in 1530 and ratified in 1532.

In 1507, Schwarzenberg was a leader of the knights of Franconia. From 1522 to 1524, he was a member of the Reichsregiment (Imperial regiment), a body formed for the government of the Holy Roman Empire, and in the absence of Charles V even the governor of the Empire.

He composed moral and satirical poems and works regarding the Reformation. He also did translations, mainly of Cicero. He was an early adherent and friend of Martin Luther.

== See also ==
- House of Schwarzenberg
