= Heinrich Groß von Trockau =

Prince-bishop of Bamberg (died 1501)

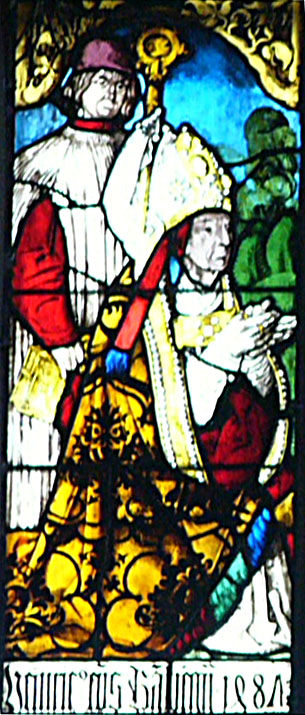
Stained glass window in St. Sebaldus Church, Nuremberg depicting Heinrich Groß von Trockau.

Heinrich Groß von Trockau (died 1501) was the Prince-Bishop of Bamberg from 1487 to 1501.

The date of Heinrich Groß von Trockau's birth is unknown, but he was already a prebendary of Augsburg Cathedral in 1451. On 14 March 1452 he became a canon of Bamberg Cathedral. He graduated from Heidelberg University in 1452. He was made a deacon on 20 April 1454.

On 1 February 1487 the cathedral chapter of Bamberg Cathedral elected Groß von Trockau to be Prince-Bishop of Bamberg and Pope Innocent VIII confirmed his appointment on 28 March 1487. He was consecrated as a bishop by Friedrich von Hohenzollern, Prince-Bishop of Augsburg, in Nuremberg on 15 July 1487.

He died in Bamberg on 30 March 1501.

Catholic Church titles
Preceded by Philipp von Henneberg	Prince-Bishop of Bamberg; 1487–1501	Succeeded by Veit Truchseß von Pommersfelden
