= Veit Truchseß von Pommersfelden =

German Prince-Bishop

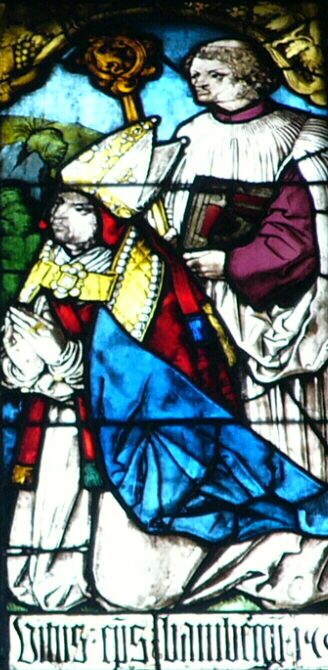
Stained glass window in St. Sebaldus Church, Nuremberg depicting Veit Truchseß von Pommersfelden.

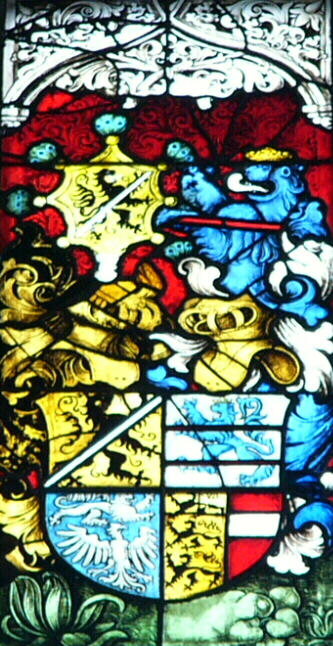
Coat of arms of Veit Truchseß von Pommersfelden.

Veit Truchseß von Pommersfelden (died 1503) was the Prince-Bishop of Bamberg from 1501 to 1503.

== Biography ==
Veit Truchseß von Pommersfelden's family name ("Truchseß von Pommersfelden") came from a court office that the family held in Pommersfelden, with the title becoming an integral part of the family name.

The cathedral chapter of Bamberg Cathedral elected Truchseß von Pommersfelden to be Prince-Bishop of Bamberg on 3 April 1501, with Pope Alexander VI affirming his appointment on 7 May 1501.

He died on 7 September 1503 without ever having been consecrated as a bishop.

Catholic Church titles
Preceded by Heinrich Groß von Trockau	Prince-Bishop of Bamberg; 1501–1503	Succeeded by Georg Marschalk von Ebnet
