= Georg Fuchs von Rügheim =

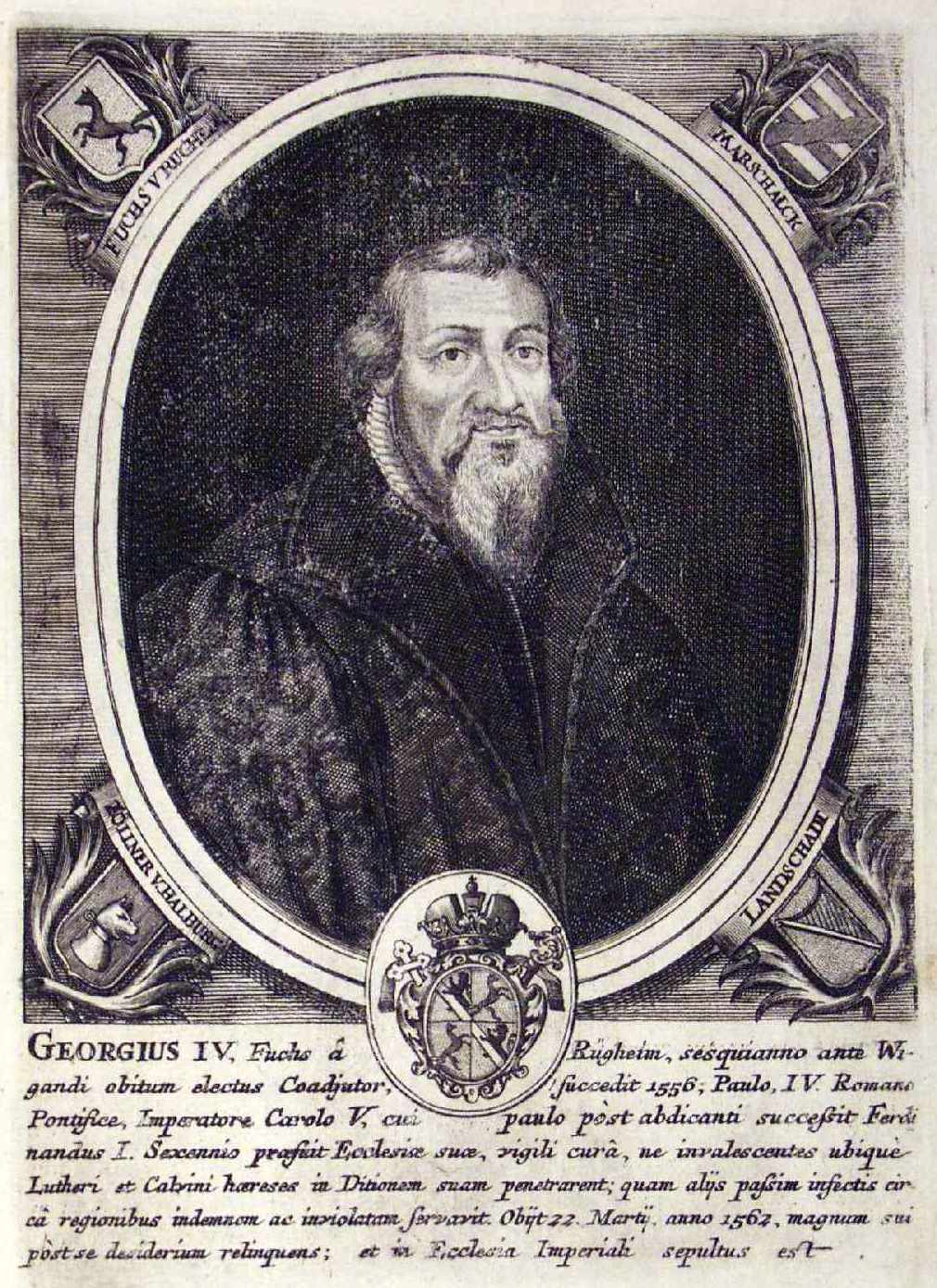
Engraving of Georg Fuchs von Rügheim by Johann Salver.

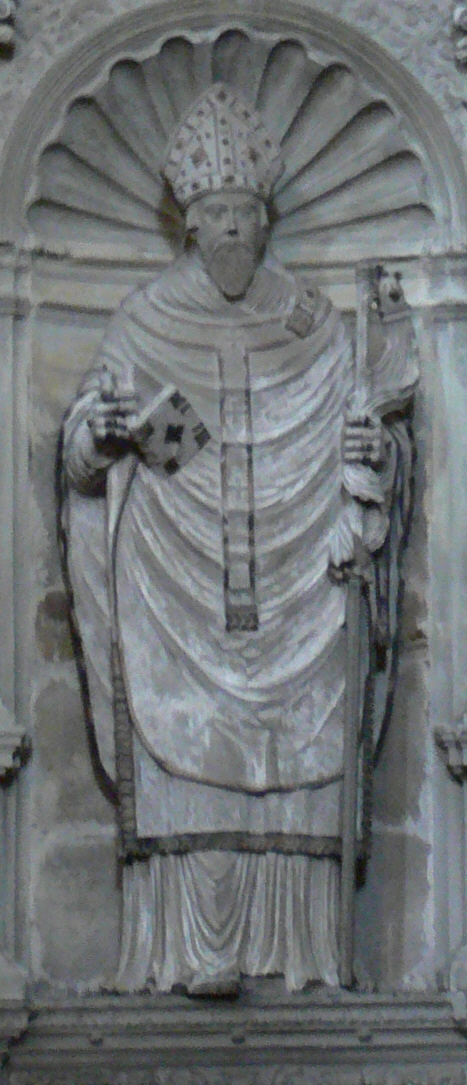
Monument to Georg Fuchs von Rügheim in Bamberg Cathedral.

Georg Fuchs von Rügheim (1519–1561) was the Prince-Bishop of Bamberg from 1556 to 1561.

== Biography ==
Georg Fuchs von Rügheim was born in Rügheim, which is today a district of Hofheim, Bavaria, on February 6, 1519. He matriculated at the University of Erfurt in 1535; at Heidelberg University in 1537; and at the University of Ingolstadt in 1539.

He was appointed coadjutor bishop of Bamberg on 25 August 1554, with Pope Julius III confirming the appointment on 26 May 1555. He succeeded Weigand von Redwitz as Prince-Bishop of Bamberg on 22 May 1556. He was ordained as a priest on 14 November 1557. He was consecrated as a bishop by Petrus Rauh, auxiliary bishop of Bamberg, on 28 November 1557.

He died on 22 March 1561. He is buried in Bamberg Cathedral, with a monument by Kilian Sorge.

Catholic Church titles
Preceded by Weigand von Redwitz	Prince-Bishop of Bamberg; 1556–1561	Succeeded by Veit von Würzburg
