= Georg Marschalk von Ebnet =

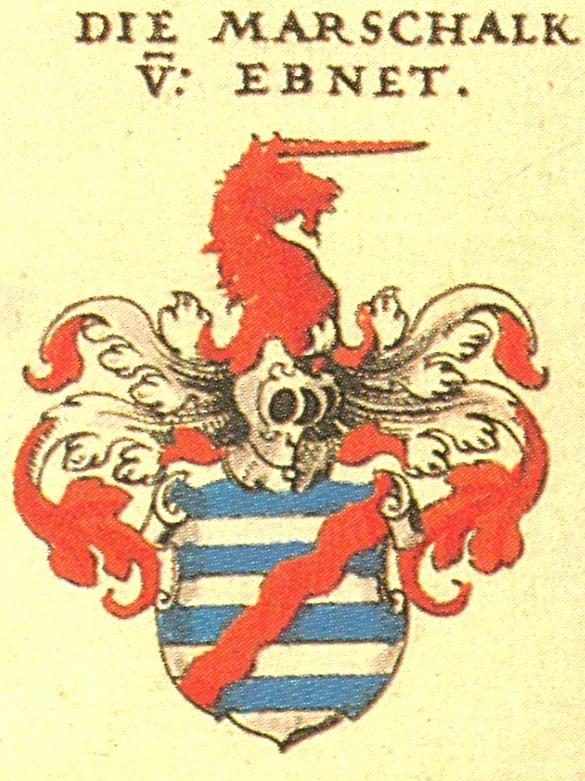
Marschalk von Ebnet family coat of arms.

Georg Marschalk von Ebnet (died 1505) was the Prince-Bishop of Bamberg from 1503 to 1505.

== Biography ==
Georg Marschalk von Ebnet was a member of the Marschalk von Ebnet family, which derived its name from being hereditary Marshal of Ebnet, now a district of Burgkunstadt.

The cathedral chapter of Bamberg Cathedral elected Marschalk von Ebnet to be Prince-Bishop of Bamberg on 19 September 1503. Pope Julius II confirmed his appointment on 11 December 1503.

He died on 30 January 1505 without ever having been consecrated as a bishop.

Catholic Church titles
| Preceded by Veit Truchseß von Pommersfelden | Prince-Bishop of Bamberg; 1503–1505 | Succeeded by Georg Schenk von Limpurg |
