= Constitutio Criminalis Carolina =

Holy Roman Empire legislation

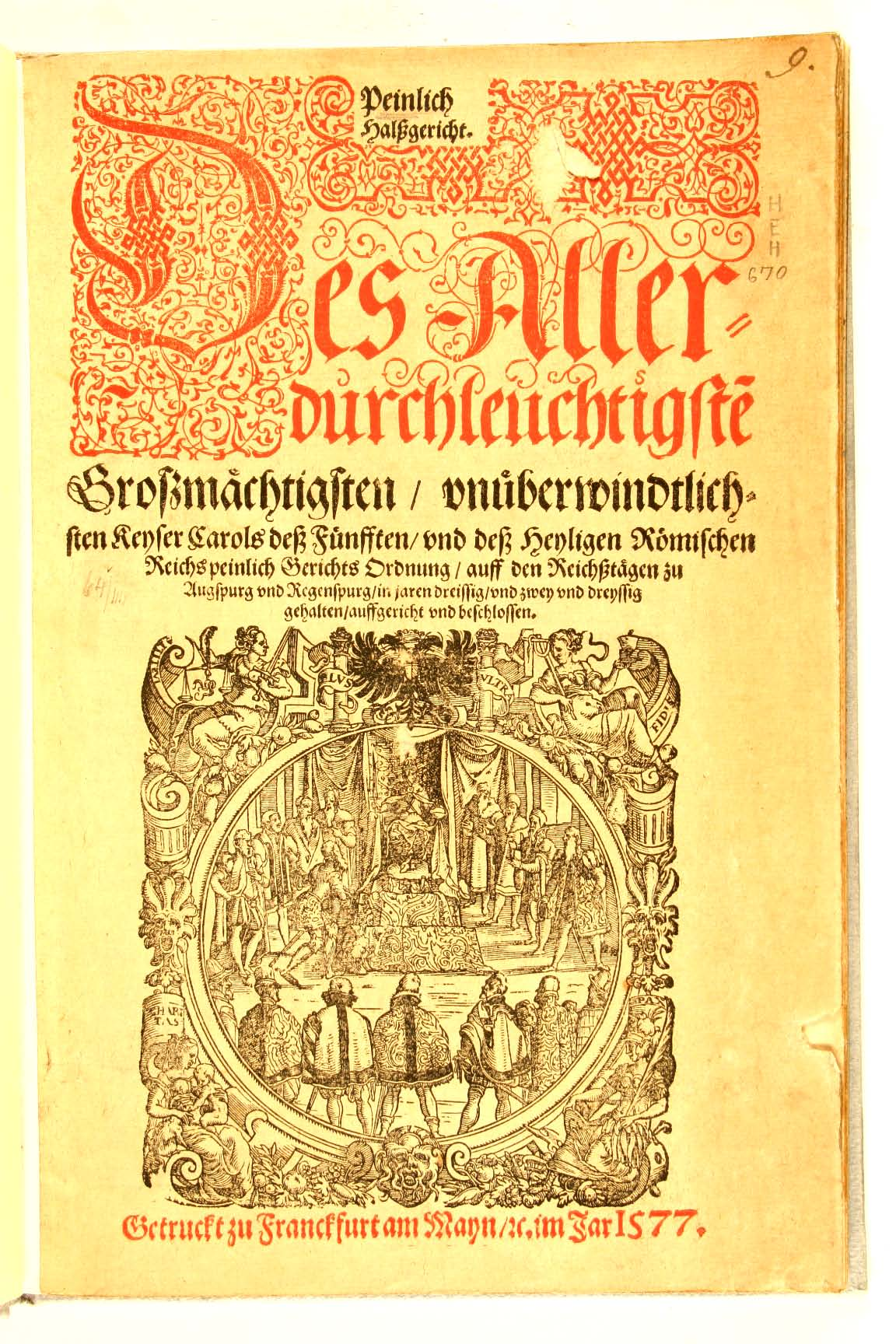
Title page

The Constitutio Criminalis Carolina (sometimes shortened to Carolina) is recognised as the first body of German criminal law (Strafgesetzbuch). It was also known as the Halsgerichtsordnung (Procedure for the judgment of capital crimes) of Charles V.

Its basis was the Halsgerichtsordnung of Bamberg (also known as the Bambergensis) drawn up by Johann Freiherr von Schwarzenberg in 1507, which in turn went back to the humanistic school of Roman law.

The Carolina was agreed in 1530 at the Diet of Augsburg under Holy Roman Emperor Charles V and ratified two years later at the Diet in Regensburg (1532) (which was judicially a Hoftag, an informal meeting), at which point it became law. It predominantly covered civil law alongside criminal law. Under the terms of the Constitutio Criminalis Carolina, actions such as murder, manslaughter, robbery, arson, homosexual relations, and witchcraft were henceforth defined as severe crimes. In particular, the Carolina specified that those found guilty of causing harm through witchcraft should be executed with fire, laying the foundation for the mass witch trials between 1580 and 1680. It was also the basis for the use of obtaining confessions by torture.

The aim of the Constitutio Criminalis Carolina was to unify the legal system of the Holy Roman Empire, and thereby put an end to the penal jurisdiction which had until then varied haphazardly between the Empire's states. The Carolina succeeded in this despite a severability clause under which the Carolina only had subsidiary importance to the particular laws of the Imperial Estates. This severability clause was necessary to secure the assent of the Imperial Estates, which wanted to hold on to their own legal and legislative powers. Nevertheless, the severability clause did not detract from the Carolina's unification of the legal system and its reformatory effect on criminal law was indisputable.

Further historical importance of the Constitutio Criminalis Carolina arises from the fact that this was the first adoption of the canonical Italian legal institute of the inquisition. Earlier criminal law only dealt with accusations of the victim of the crime without making inquiries of its own. The inquisition gave the court the chance to examine a case on its own accord and to find a judgement basing only on facts without being restricted by the interests of the parties.
