= Veit von Würzburg =

German Prince-Bishop

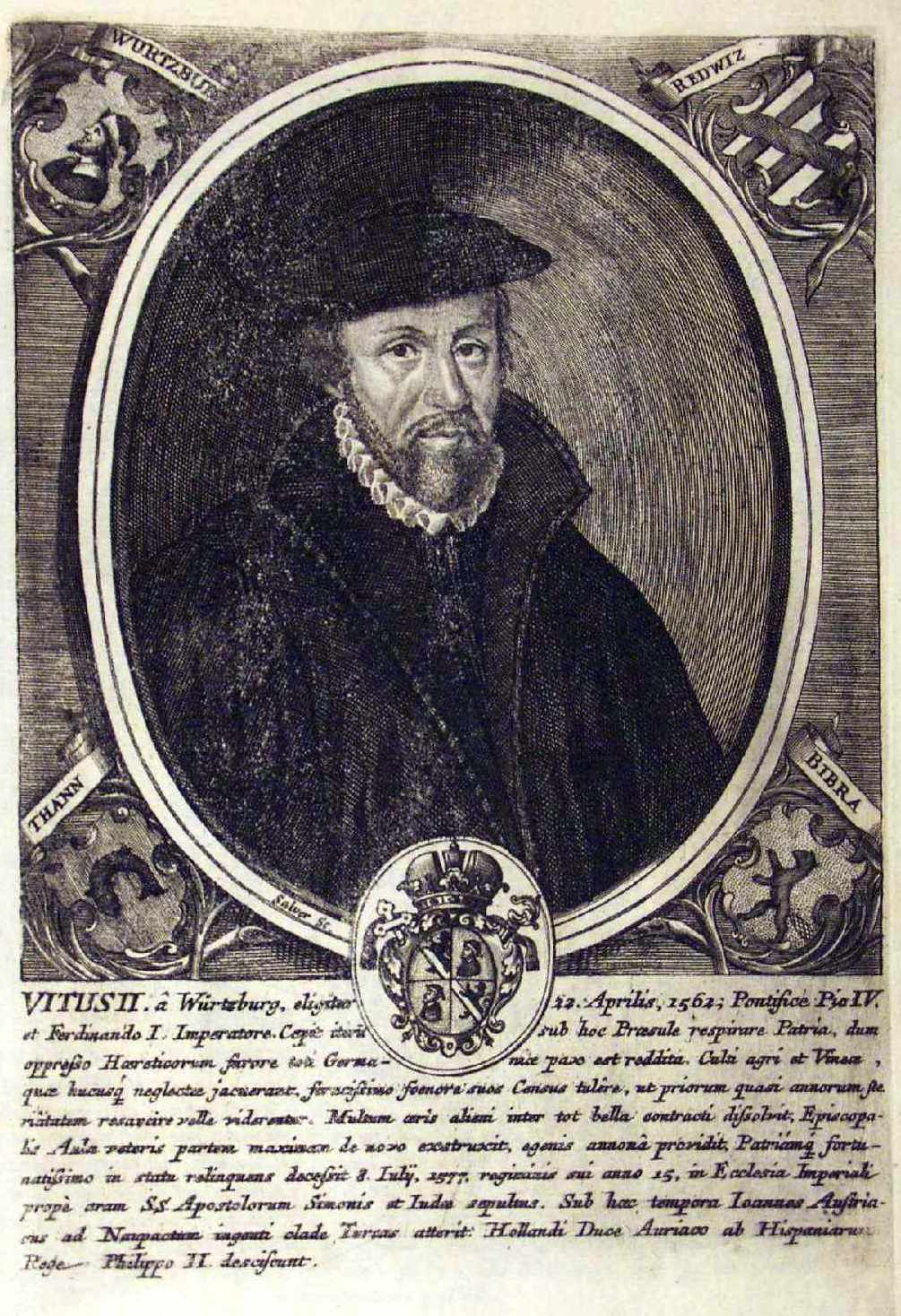
- Engraving of Veit von Würzburg by Johann Salver
- Born: 15 June 1519; Rothenkirchen
- Died: 8 July 1577 (aged 58)
- Occupation: Prince of Bamberg from 1561-1577

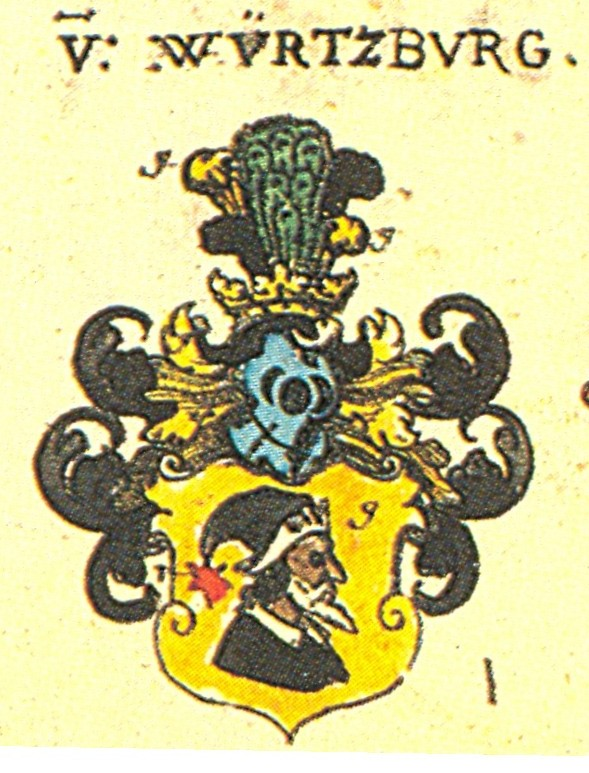
Würzburg family coat of arms.

Veit von Würzburg (1519–1577) was the Prince-Bishop of Bamberg from 1561 to 1577.

== Biography ==
Veit von Würzburg was born in Rothenkirchen, now incorporated into Pressig, on 15 June 1519.

He was elected Prince-Bishop of Bamberg on 22 April 1561, with Pope Pius IV confirming the appointment on 19 November 1561. He was ordained as a priest in 1566. Friedrich Lichtenauer, auxiliary bishop of Bamberg, consecrated him as a bishop on 28 June 1562.

He died on 8 July 1577 and is buried in Michaelsberg Abbey, Bamberg.

Catholic Church titles
| Preceded by Georg Fuchs von Rügheim | Prince-Bishop of Bamberg; 1561–1577 | Succeeded by Johann Georg Zobel von Giebelstadt |
