= Forchheim Fortress =

Coordinates: 49.7227°N 11.0570°E

Forchheim Fortress (German: Festung Forchheim) was laid out after the occupation of the town of Forchheim during the Second Margrave War (1552) by the Bishopric of Bamberg. Today about one third of the fortification works have survived and have been incorporated into the municipal parks.

== History ==
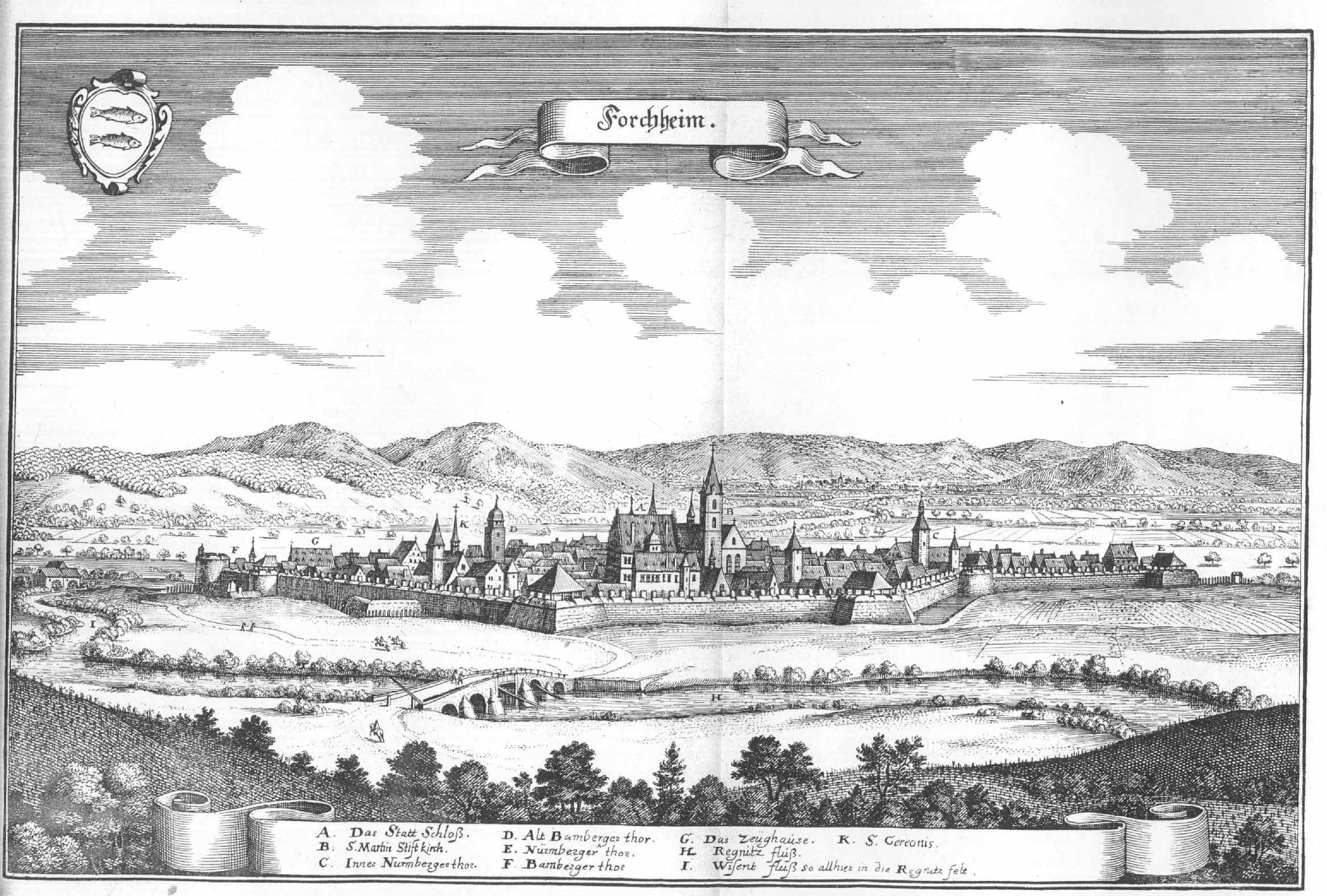
Forchheim Fortress from the west (Matthäus Merian: Topographia Franconiae, 1648)

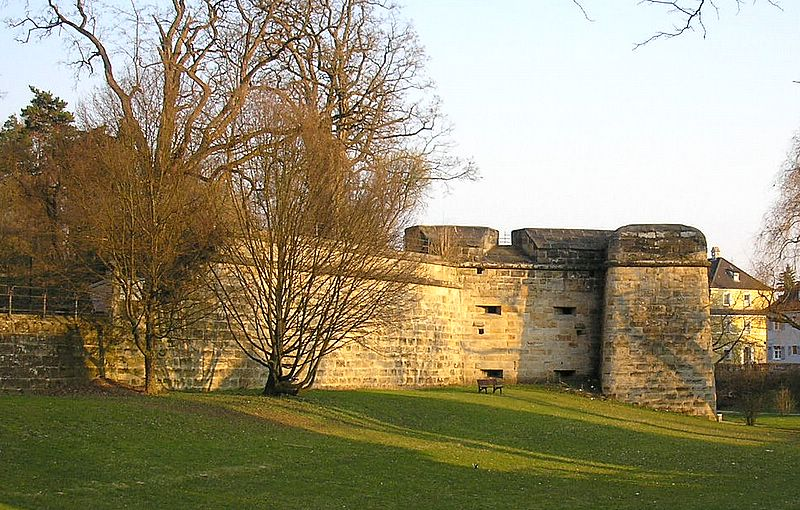
St. Veit's Bastion from the north...

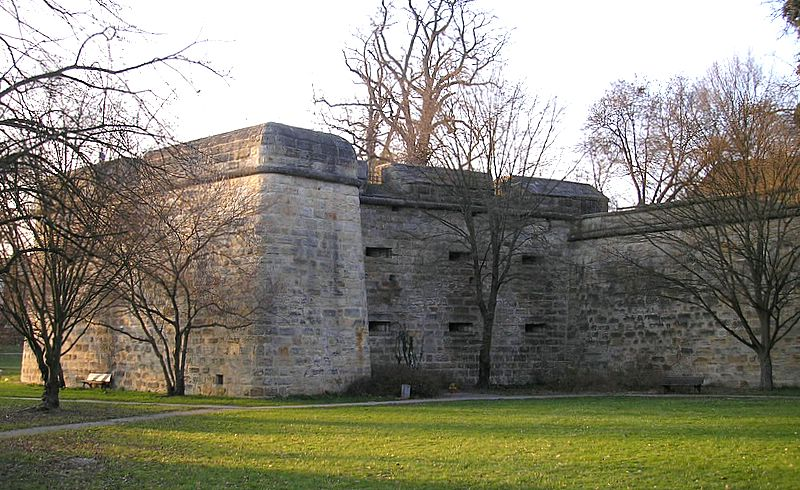
...and from the south

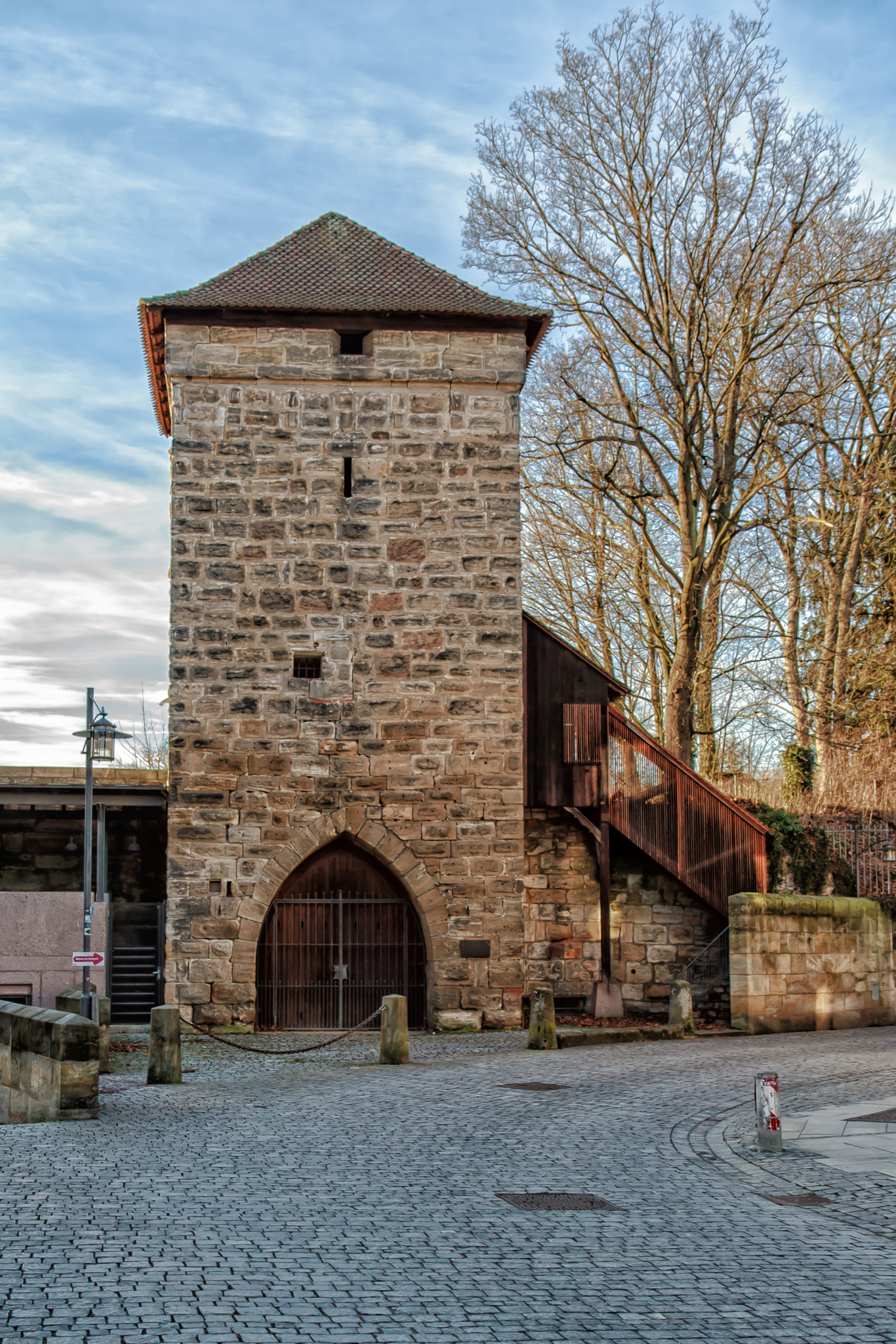
The Saltor Tower

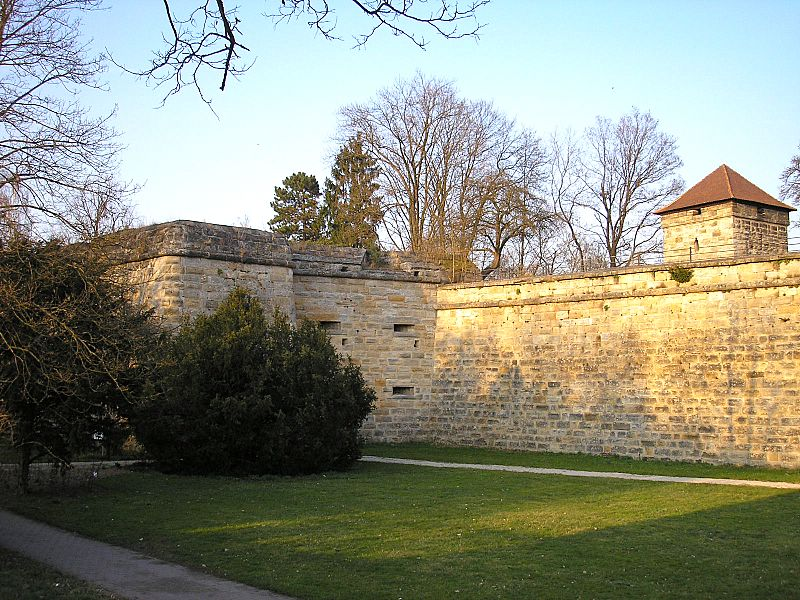
Bastion by the Saltor Tower

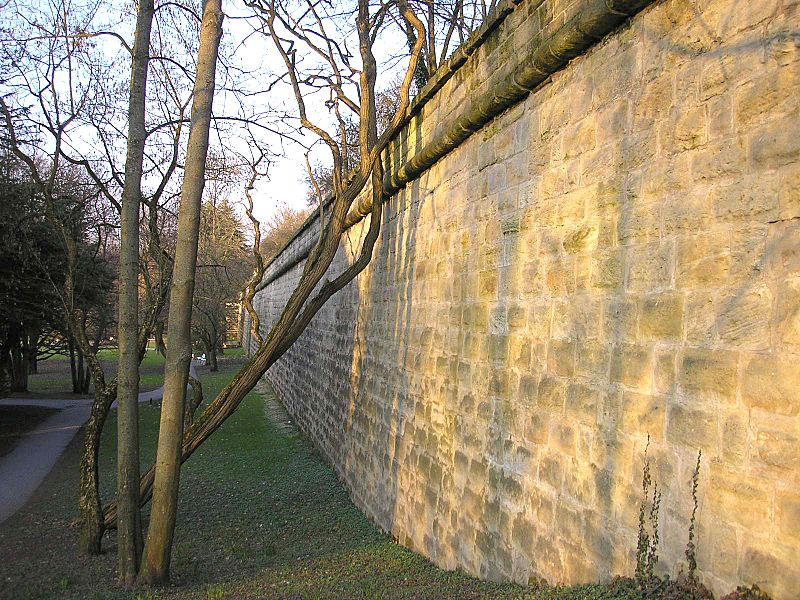
Curtain wall between the bastion by the Saltor Tower and St. Valentine's Outwork

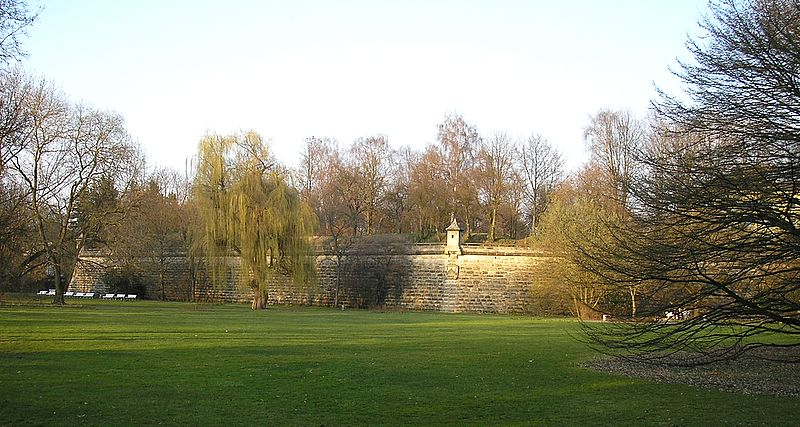
St. Valentine's Outwork from the west

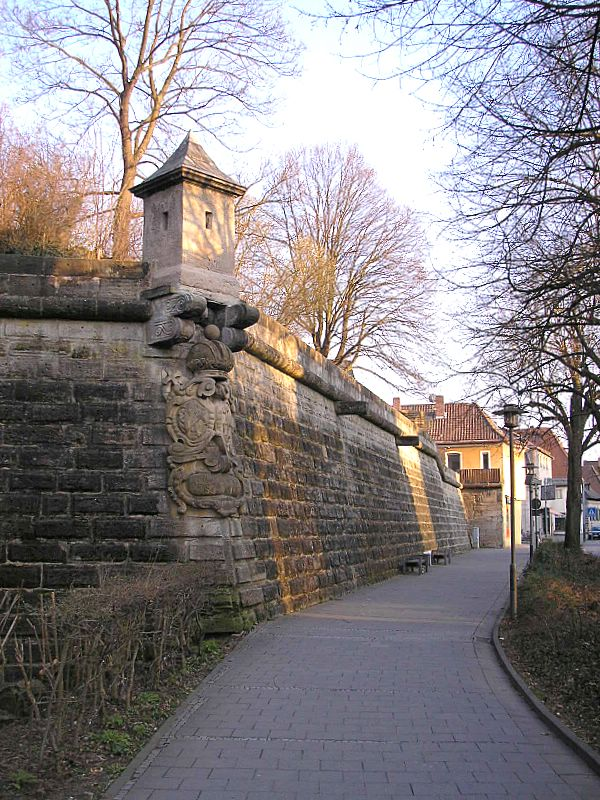
St. Peter's Outwork, west flank

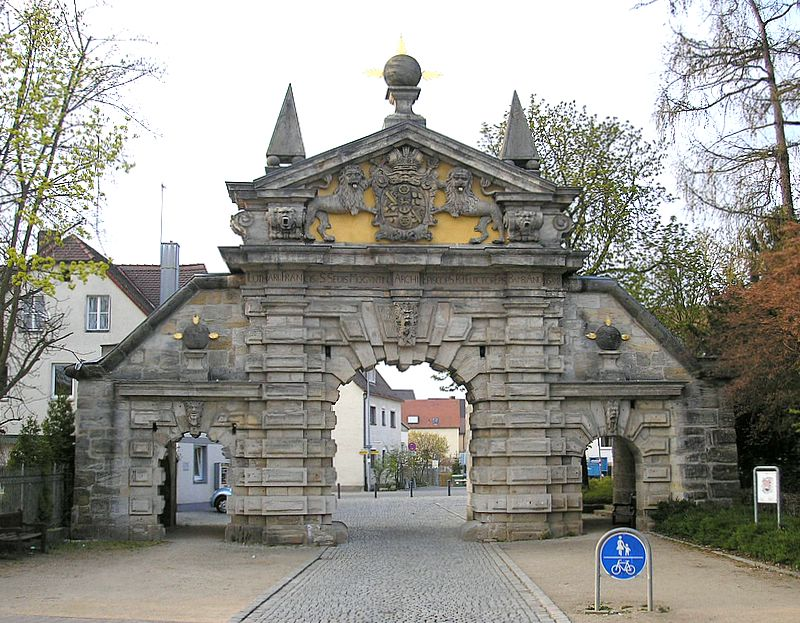
The Nuremberg Gate (1698)

In 1552, during the Second Margrave War, troops of the Margrave of Culmbach, Albrecht Alcibiades, occupied Forchheim for three months. After its recapture by Claus of Egloffstein, the Bishopric of Bamberg decided to expand the town to the southern border fortification in line with the latest Italian fortification practice. Building work began in 1553 with St. Veit's Bastion south of Forchheim Castle, the so-called Pfalz. In 1561/62, the bastion by the Saltor Tower was added. The northeast corner of the town's fortress was protected by a round artillery tower. New entrances were created: the Bamberg Gate in 1557, the Reuth Gate in 1567, the Old Nuremberg Gate in 1570, and the Sattler Gate in 1578/79. The inflows and outflows of the Wiesent were guarded by two moated castles, of which the northern one has been preserved.

At the beginning of the 17th century, work on the fortifications stalled. At the beginning of the Thirty Years' War, the medieval town wall still existed to a large extent. The fortifications were supplemented by new defensive works. During the war there was no major [siege], although Forchheim was important strategically and as an assembly area for troops and as a refuge. The fortress proved itself for the first time.

After the end of the fighting, the expansion of the fortifications continued. In 1655, St. Cunigund's Outwork was built in the east and, one year later, St. Philip's Outwork. St. Valentine's Outwork (a zwinger-bastion, 1657) and St. Henry's Outwork (Dreikirchen Work) have been fully or partially preserved. In 1675, St. Peter's Outwork (the Dernbach Bastion) was added in the north-east and, in 1683, the large St. Martin's Outwork (New Work), which has since disappeared. Prince Bishop Lothair Francis of Schönborn sent military architect, Maximilian von Welsch, in 1706 to upgrade the works.

In addition to the fortifications, numerous administrative and representative buildings were built in the town centre. The most skilled architects in the Archbishopric were involved in the planning. For example, Balthasar Neumann designed the barracks of the prince-bishops dragoons (1730–33). The garrison headquarters (Kommandantur) on Parade Square (Paradeplatz) was designed by Johann Jakob Michael Küchel.

In the wake of the secularization of the Bishopric of Bamberg, the fortress was transferred to the Electorate of Bavaria, which was elevated to a kingdom in 1806. Its role as a fortress was ended in 1838 by the army as the defences had become unnecessary. In 1875, the town acquired a large part of the fortifications and undertook to demolish them. Even after the First World War, parts of the ensemble disappeared. The demolition material was used to build the municipal secondary school and the church in Hallerndorf. However, the moats of the fortifications in the north and north-east were transformed into a large park, which is now used by the townfolk as a recreation area.

== See also ==
- List of archbishops and bishops of Bamberg

== Picture sources ==
- Ansicht der Stadt Forchheim vom Westen (engraving by Matthäus Merian, 1648)
- „Reuther Tor Bastion“ (vor 1875, Photo in the Forchheim Municipal Archives)
- „Vor dem Bamberger Tor“ (Aquarell von Michael Kotz, 1910/11, Pfalz Museum, Forchheim)
- „Vor dem Nürnberger Tor 1887“ (Aquarell von Michael Kotz, 1910/11, Pfalz Museum, Forchheim)
- Uraufnahmeblatt der Stadt Forchheim, 1825 (Bavarian State Survey Office, Munich)

== Literature ==
- Ingomar Bog: Forchheim. In: Historischer Atlas von Bayern. Teil Franken, Issue V, Munich, 1955.
- Daniel Burger: Burg und Festung Forchheim. (= Burgen Schlösser und Wehrbauten in Mitteleuropa, Vol. 19), Regensburg (Verlag Schnell und Steiner), 2004, ISBN 3-7954-1658-2.
- Daniel Burger: Festungen in Bayern. Regensburg, 2008, pp. 73–76. ISBN 978-3-7954-1844-1.
- Konrad Kupfer: Forchheim. Geschichte einer alten fränkischen Stadt. Nuremberg, 1960.
- Hartwig Neumann: Festungsbau-Kunst und -Technik. area, Erftstadt, 2004, ISBN 3-89996-268-0.
- Max Schleifer, Winfried Keller: Forchheim. Nuremberg, 1981.
- Katharina Sitzmann: Stadt Forchheim. In: Denkmäler in Bayern. Vol. IV.53/1, Munich/Zurich, 1989, ISBN 3-7954-1006-1.
