= Annafest =

Franconian folk festival

The Annafest is a Franconian folk festival held yearly about 26 July (St. Anna's day) in the Kellerwald ("Cellar Woods") in the town of Forchheim. It started in 1840.

The area is known for Bierkellers, or beer cellars, that showcase their food and drinks during the festival. The festival also offers carnival rides and live musical performances.

The festival's food stands sell German sausages, barbecued food, platters and fried fish as well as non-consumables. The Annafest contains seating for about 30,000, and the Kellerwald provides enough space for the 45,000 – 50,000 visitors who come each day, and up to 600,000 during the 10 days festival period.

== Annafest's history ==
The local breweries Hebendanz, Greif, Eichhorn and Neder all brew a strong Bock beer specially for this festival, the so-called Annafestbier. This is stored for several weeks before the festival begins.

== Dates ==
- 2006: July 22 – July 31
- 2007: July 21 – July 30
- 2008: July 26 – August 4
- 2009: July 25 – August 3
- 2010: July 24 – August 2
- 2011: July 23 – August 1
- 2012: July 21 – July 30
- 2013: July 20 – July 29
- 2014: July 25 – August 4
- 2015: July 24 – August 3
- 2016: July 22 – August 1
- 2017: July 21 – July 31
- 2018: July 20 – July 30
- 2019: July 26 – August 5
- 2020: July 24 – August 3 (cancelled due to the COVID-19 pandemic)
- 2021: July 23 – August 2 (cancelled due to the COVID-19 pandemic)
- 2022: July 22 – August 1
- 2023: July 21 – July 31
- 2024: July 26 – August 5
- 2025: July 25 – August 4
- 2026: July 24 – August 3

== The beer and the cellars ==
At the Forchheimer Annafest, beer is served in 23 cellars, which are divided into "upper" and "lower" cellars due to their location on the slope of the Kellerberg.

The 13 lower cellars and their beers are:

Schindlerkeller (Brauerei Greif), Greif-Keller (Brauerei Greif), Schäffbräu Keller* (Schanzenbräu), Hebendanz-Keller (Brauerei Hebendanz), Mahrs-Bräu-Keller* (formerly Kronen-Keller, Mahrsbräu), Fritz-Schneider-Keller* (Brauerei Simon), Winterbauer-Keller (Brauerei Först), Brauerei Hofmann (St.-Georgen-Bräu), Schaufel-Keller, Kaiser-Keller* (Veldensteiner Kaiser-Bräu), Brauwastl-Keller* (Brauwastl), Nürnberger-Tor-Keller* (Brauerei Nikl), Fäßla-Keller* (Veldensteiner Kaiser-Bräu).

The 10 upper cellars are:

Schlößla-Keller (Brauerei Hebendanz), Glocken-Keller (Brauerei Rittmayer), Stäffala-Keller (Veldensteiner Kaiser-Bräu), Eichhorn-Keller (Eichhorn), Weiß-Tauben-Keller* (Täubla), Hoffmanns Keller (Brauerei Greif), Schwanen-Keller* (Zirndorfer Landbier), Neder-Keller (Neder-Brauerei), Schützenkeller (all Forchheimer beers), Blümleins-Keller* (Eichhorn).

The beer cellars marked with * are only open during the Annafest. The others are open in the summer season (usually from May 1 to the end of September). A few are also open in winter.

The local breweries Brauerei Hebendanz, Brauerei Greif, Eichhorn and Brauerei Neder brew a strong beer especially for this festival, the Annafestbier, which is stored in the beer cellars in the Kellerwald for several weeks before the start of the festival. For the first time in 2011, the Rittmayer brewery in nearby Hallerndorf brewed a special Annafestbier, which was served in the Weiß-Tauben-Keller.
