= Waligóra Pine =

Natural monument in Sulechów, Poland

- Sosna Waligóra (Polish)
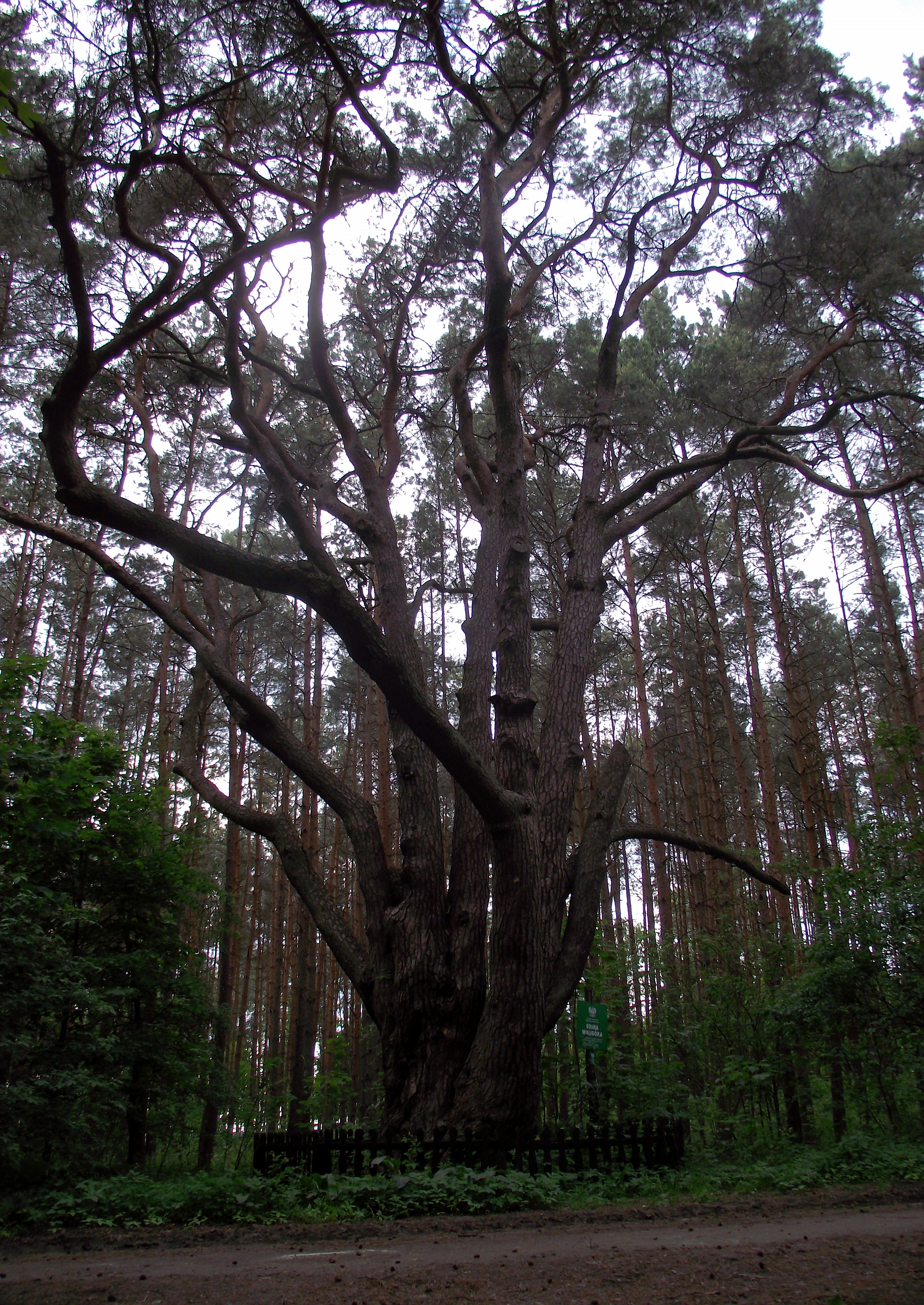
- Interactive map of Waligóra Pine
- Location: Sulechów, Poland
- Coordinates: 52°05′32.3″N 15°40′14.7″E
- Type: natural monument, Scotch pine
- Height: 527 cm (17.29 ft)
- Inauguration date: 30 December 1982

Waligóra Pine is an over 160-year-old specimen of Scotch pine (Pinus sylvestris) growing near National Road 32 close to Sulechów, within the Klępsk Forest District of the Sulechów Forest District. Designated as a natural monument, it is one of 102 such protected objects in Gmina Sulechów.

The Waligóra Pine is the second thickest pine in Poland, surpassed only by the Rzepicha Pine. In 2002, it was recognized as the thickest pine submitted in the "Thickest Tree in Poland" competition organized by Przegląd Leśniczy.

== Location ==
The pine grows approximately 1.5 kilometers east of Sulechów, along a dirt road 50 meters south of National Road 32, within the Klępsk Forest District of the Sulechów Forest District.

The tree is situated along two tourist trails in Gmina Sulechów: the 44-km green trail of natural monuments and the 10.5-km black southern trail. A forest educational path, "To Waligóra", also leads to the tree. Additionally, the "Freedom is in Nature" cycling trail passes nearby.

== Characteristics ==
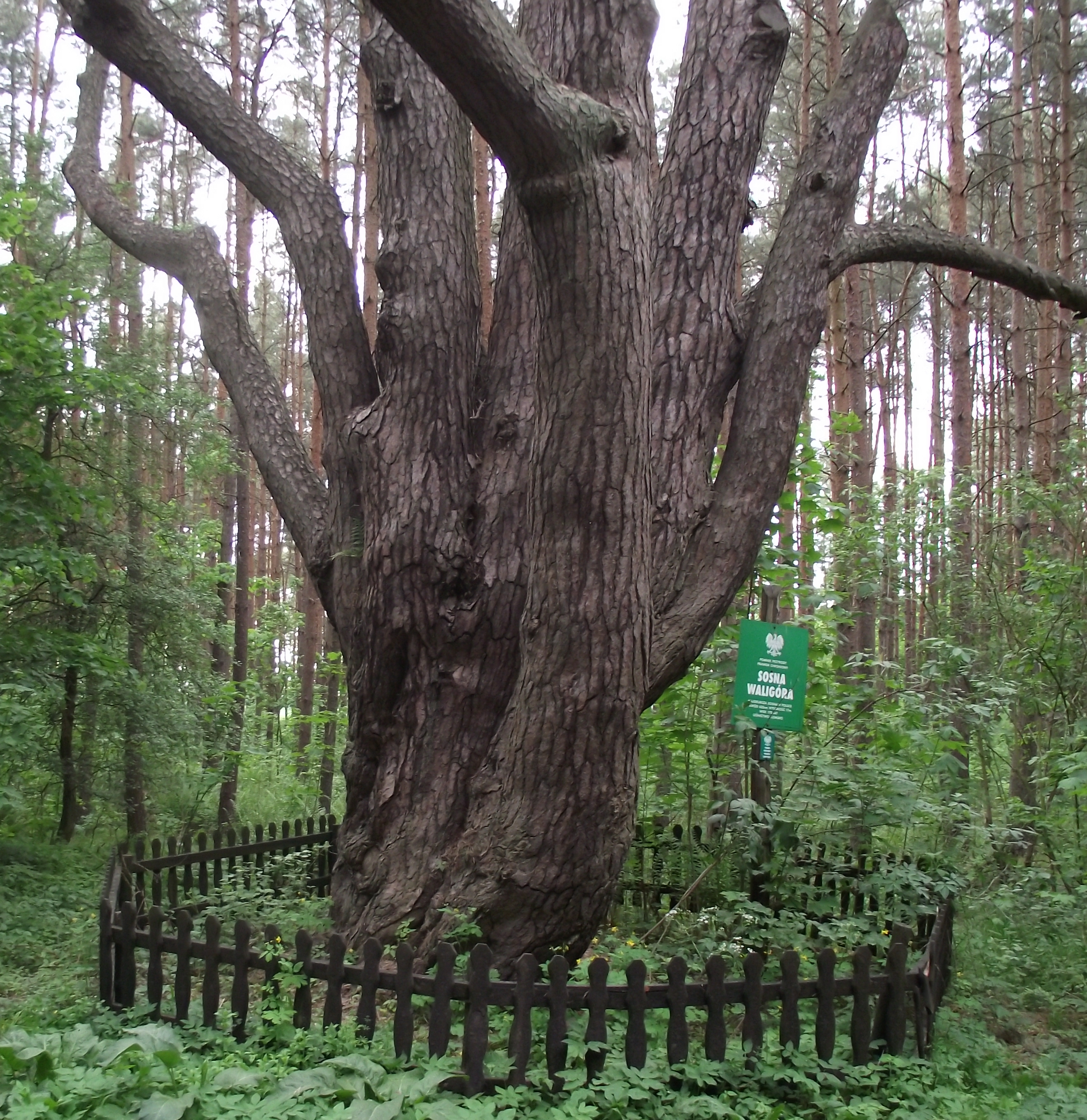
Trunk of the Waligóra Pine

The Waligóra Pine likely formed from the fusion of at least two trees, originally growing at the edge of a forest and a field, which was afforested after World War II, placing the pine within the forest.

The thick trunk of the tree branches out at about 2 meters. From one trunk, eight twisted branches form a wide-spreading crown. The branches are supported by steel cables. The pine's name derives from its distinctive form. Its circumference at ground level is 527 cm, with a diameter at breast height of 620 cm, a height of 23 meters, and an estimated age of about 160 years. The pine is surrounded by a small wooden fence.

For a long time, the Waligóra Pine was considered Poland's thickest pine, but due to changes in measurement methods, it now ranks second, behind the Rzepicha Pine in the same forest district, which has a circumference of 568 cm.

== History ==
In 1998, a 3.4-km forest educational path, "To Waligóra", with 18 educational stations, was created to highlight the pine.

In 2002, the tree was the thickest pine submitted to the "Thickest Tree in Poland" competition organized by Przegląd Leśniczy.

In 2004, seven tourist trails were established in Gmina Sulechów, two of which pass near the Waligóra Pine.

Legal protection as a natural monument was formalized by a decision of the Lubusz Voivode Marek Ast on 19 May 2006. However, the tree's protection dates back earlier – it was listed as a natural monument (an unnamed pine with a 620 cm circumference) in Gmina Sulechów in 1990 and officially protected as a natural monument by a decree of the Zielona Góra Voivode on 30 December 1982.

In June 2013, a "rest stop" was opened a few dozen meters from the pine, serving recreational, parking, and educational purposes with informational boards, accommodating several to a dozen cars.

In 2015, the State Forests established the "Freedom is in Nature" cycling trail, starting and ending near the Waligóra Pine.
