= Natural monument =

Natural feature of outstanding or unique value

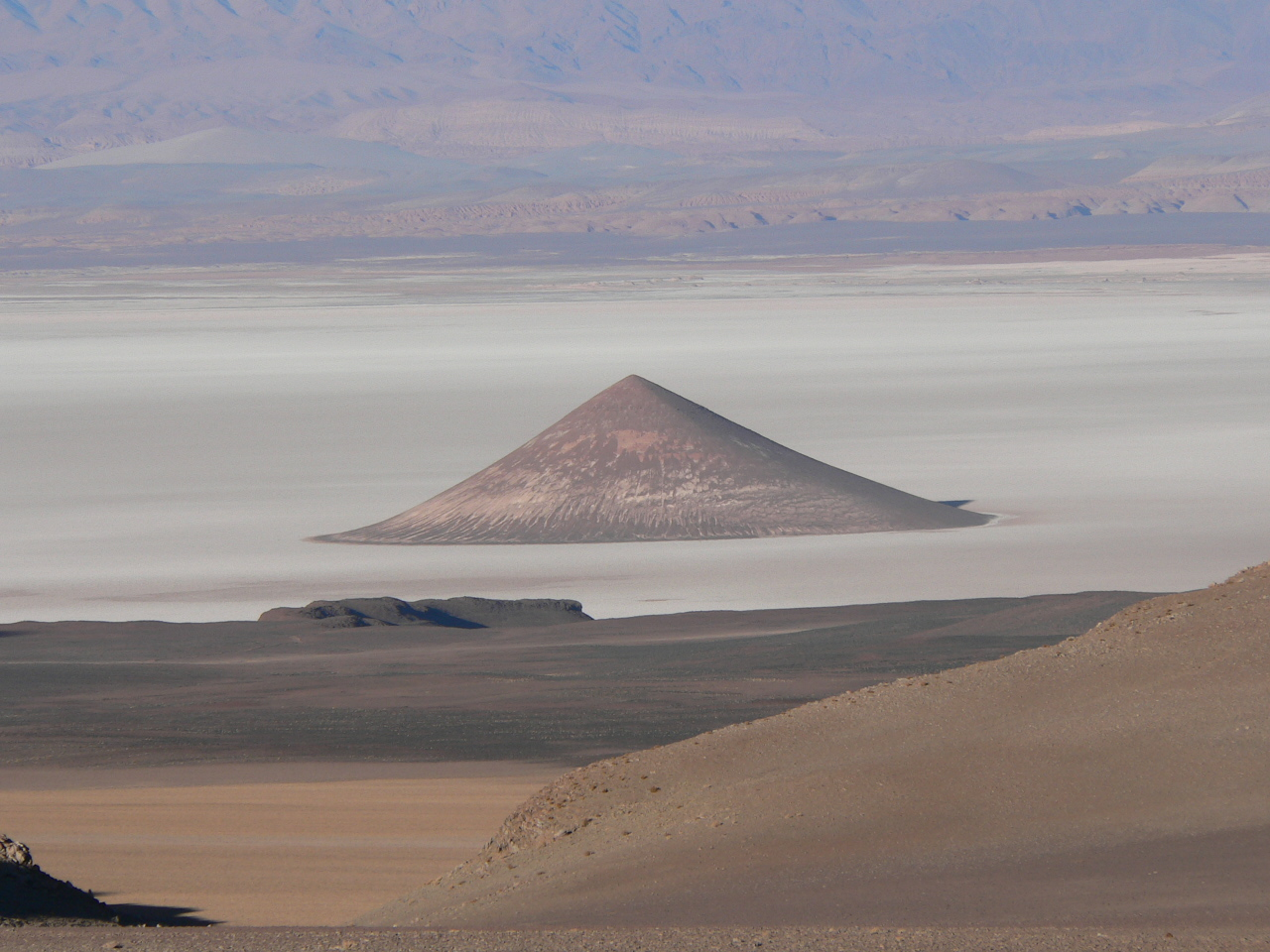
Cono de Arita, a natural monument in Argentina.

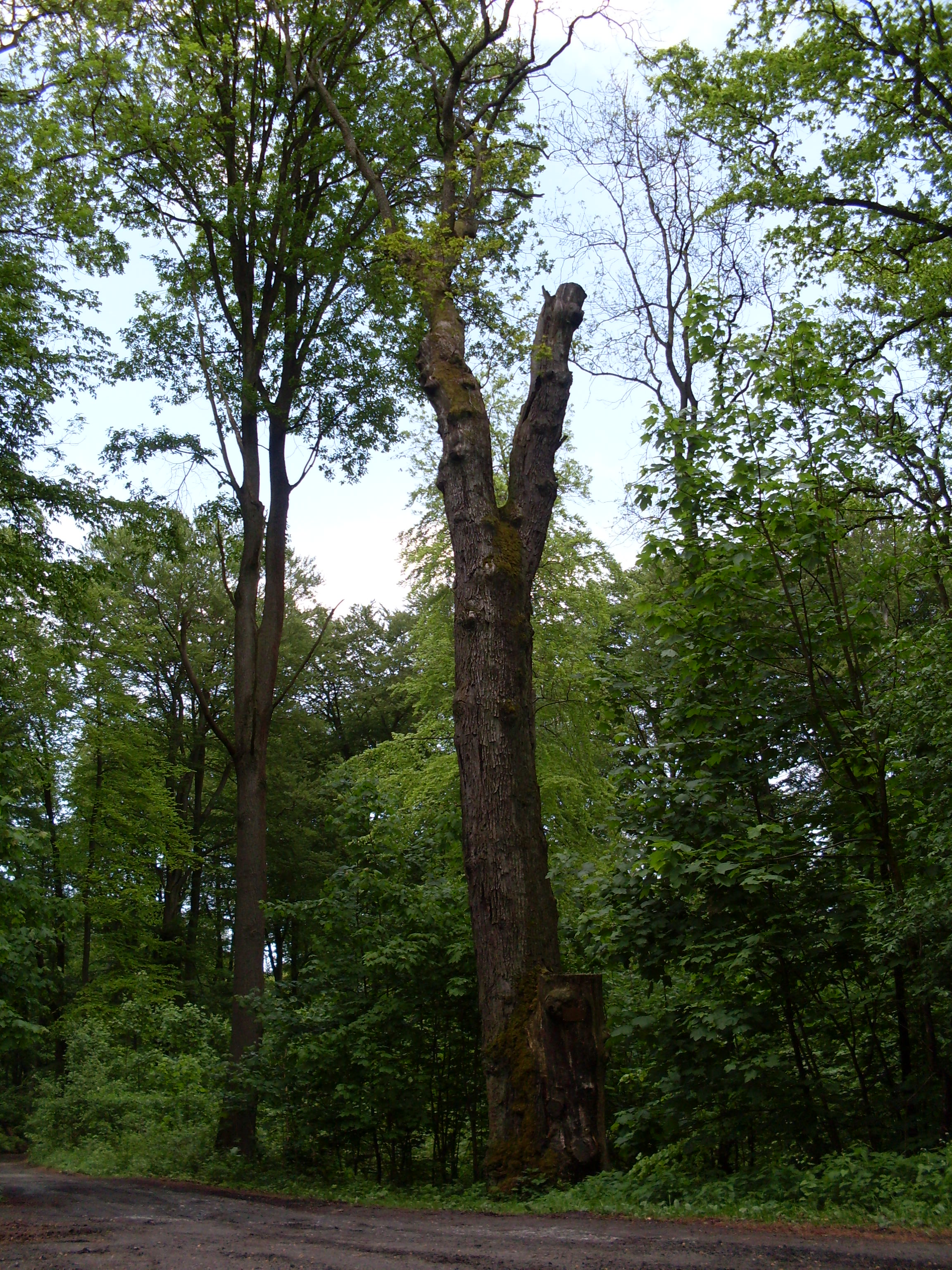
Bogusław Oak, a natural monument in Ueckermünde Heath, located near Leśno Górne, Poland.

A natural monument is a natural or cultural feature of outstanding or unique value because of its inherent rarity, representative of aesthetic qualities, or cultural significance. They can be natural geological and geographical features such as waterfalls, cliffs, craters, fossil, sand dunes, rock forms, valleys and coral reefs. Locations important to faith groups may be considered natural monuments. Archeological and historical sites linked to the natural environment are also included, such as cave art. This is especially true when relevant to the land of Indigenous Peoples.

== Protections ==
Under the International Union for Conservation of Nature and Natural Resources guidelines, natural monuments are level III, described as:

"Areas are set aside to protect a specific natural monument, which can be a landform, sea mount, submarine cavern, geological feature such as a cave or even a living feature such as an ancient grove. They are generally quite small protected areas and often have high visitor value."

This is a lower level of protection than level II (national parks) and level I (wilderness areas).

The European Environment Agency's guidelines for selection of a natural monument are:

- The area should contain one or more features of outstanding significance. Appropriate natural features include waterfalls, caves, craters, fossil beds, sand dunes and marine features, along with unique or representative fauna and flora; associated cultural features might include cave dwellings, cliff-top forts, archaeological sites, or natural sites which have heritage significance to indigenous peoples.
- The area should be large enough to protect the integrity of the feature and its immediately related surroundings.

== Examples ==
- Argentina: Cono de Arita
- Belize: Great Blue Hole
- Brazil: Ilhas Cagarras
- Germany: Weltenburg Narrows, Green Belt Thuringia, Oaks of Ivenacker, Kasberger Linde
- Japan: Terushima Cormorant Habitat
- Philippines: Chocolate Hills, Hundred Island National Park, Mayon Volcano Natural Park
- Poland: Bogusław Oak, Crooked Forest, Waligóra Pine
- Russia: Berd Rocks
- United Kingdom: White Cliffs of Dover
- United States: Grand Canyon

== See also ==
- IUCN Protected Area Management Categories: Category III Natural Monument or Feature
- Monument
- World Conservation Union
- Kasberger Linde
