= Kasberger Linde =

Natural monument in the district of Forchheim

Coordinates: 49°39′52″N 11°13′14.4″E

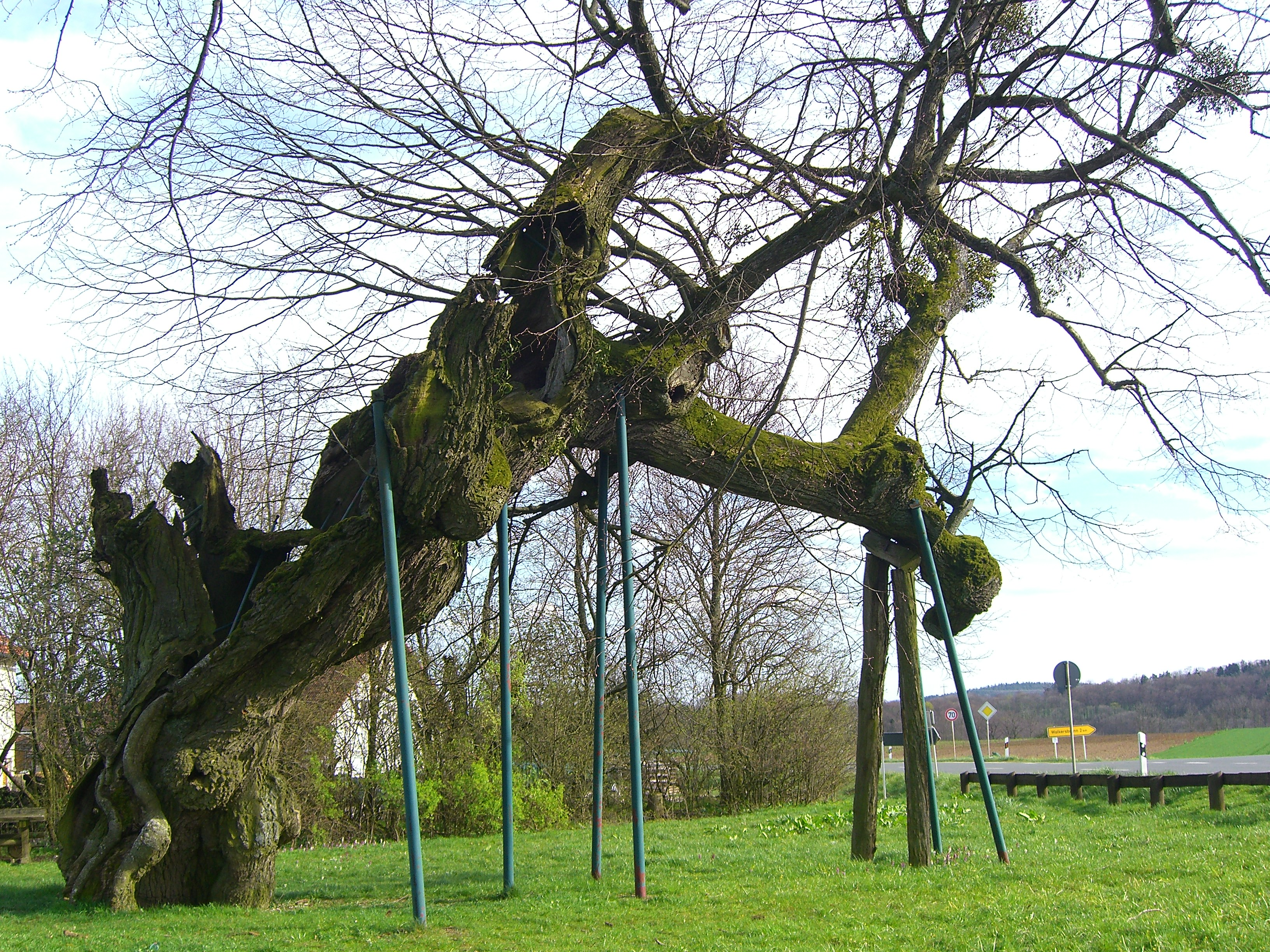
Trunk fragment of the Kasberg lime tree supported several times

The natural monument Kasberger Linde (lit. English: Kasberg lime tree), also known as Kunigundenlinde or Franzosenlinde, is a summer lime tree (Tilia platyphyllos) located on the outskirts of the Gräfenberg district of Kasberg in the Forchheim district. In the vicinity of the tree, court days were presumably held during the Middle Ages. Estimates suggest that the lime tree is between 600 and 1000 years old, and it has been officially recognized as a natural monument by the Lower Nature Conservation Authority of the Forchheim district since at least 1976. Adjacent to the ancient Kasberger Linde stands another lime tree, approximately 150 years old.

== Description ==
=== Trunk ===
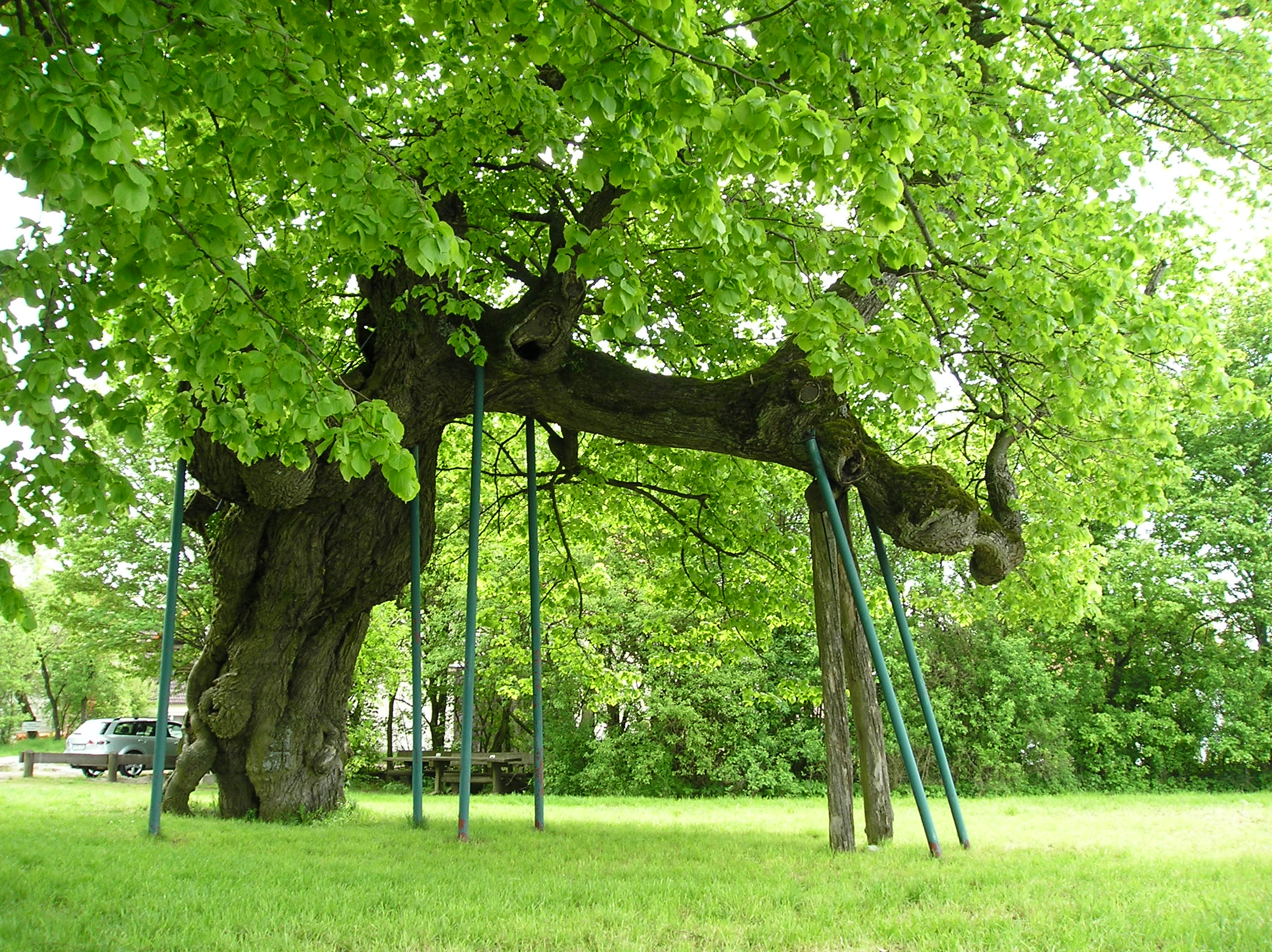
Supported branch of the Kasberger lime tree in 2005

The trunk of the lime tree has suffered significant hollowing, with much of it destroyed, leaving only a strongly inclined remnant. To support the remaining trunk and an almost horizontally projecting main branch, iron clamps, and threaded rods are used. Additional support is provided by several iron and wooden rods. Interestingly, an elder bush has taken root in the hollowed-out trunk and is growing outwards through an opening. The bark is covered with mosses and lichens in many areas, and the remaining parts of the crown are overgrown with mistletoe. If fully preserved, the trunk would have a circumference of about 16 meters. However, in 1987, the trunk circumference measured 11.2 meters, and in the year 2009, it was just under eight meters. Measurements taken at the site of the smallest diameter showed a circumference of 4.6 meters. In 1990, the total height of the tree was recorded at 11 meters, with a crown diameter of 16 meters.

=== Age ===
Due to the absence of the oldest wood from the center of the trunk, it is not possible to determine the lime tree's age accurately through methods such as annual ring counting or radiocarbon dating. As a result, the actual age of the lime tree can only be roughly estimated. In 2008, a representative from the Deutsche Baumarchiv (German Tree Archive) estimated its age to be between 600 and 800 years old. However, on several occasions, it has been speculated that the tree could be over 1000 years old. This would make the lime tree one of the ten oldest lime trees in Germany.

=== Location ===
Map of the western outskirts of Kasberg

Kasberg is situated approximately three kilometers northwest of Gräfenberg and about 25 kilometers northeast of Nuremberg. The lime tree is located on the western edge of the village at an elevation of approximately 510 meters above sea level. It stands next to the intersection of two old traffic routes: the road between Leutenbach and Gräfenberg (today FO 14) and the road between Walkersbrunn and Kasberg (FO 42/FO 14). The area is part of the Franconian Switzerland region within the Franconian Alb, characterized by a plateau landscape on its southwestern edge. The soil surrounding the lime tree consists of calcareous, loamy weathering material from the White Jurassic period.

== History ==
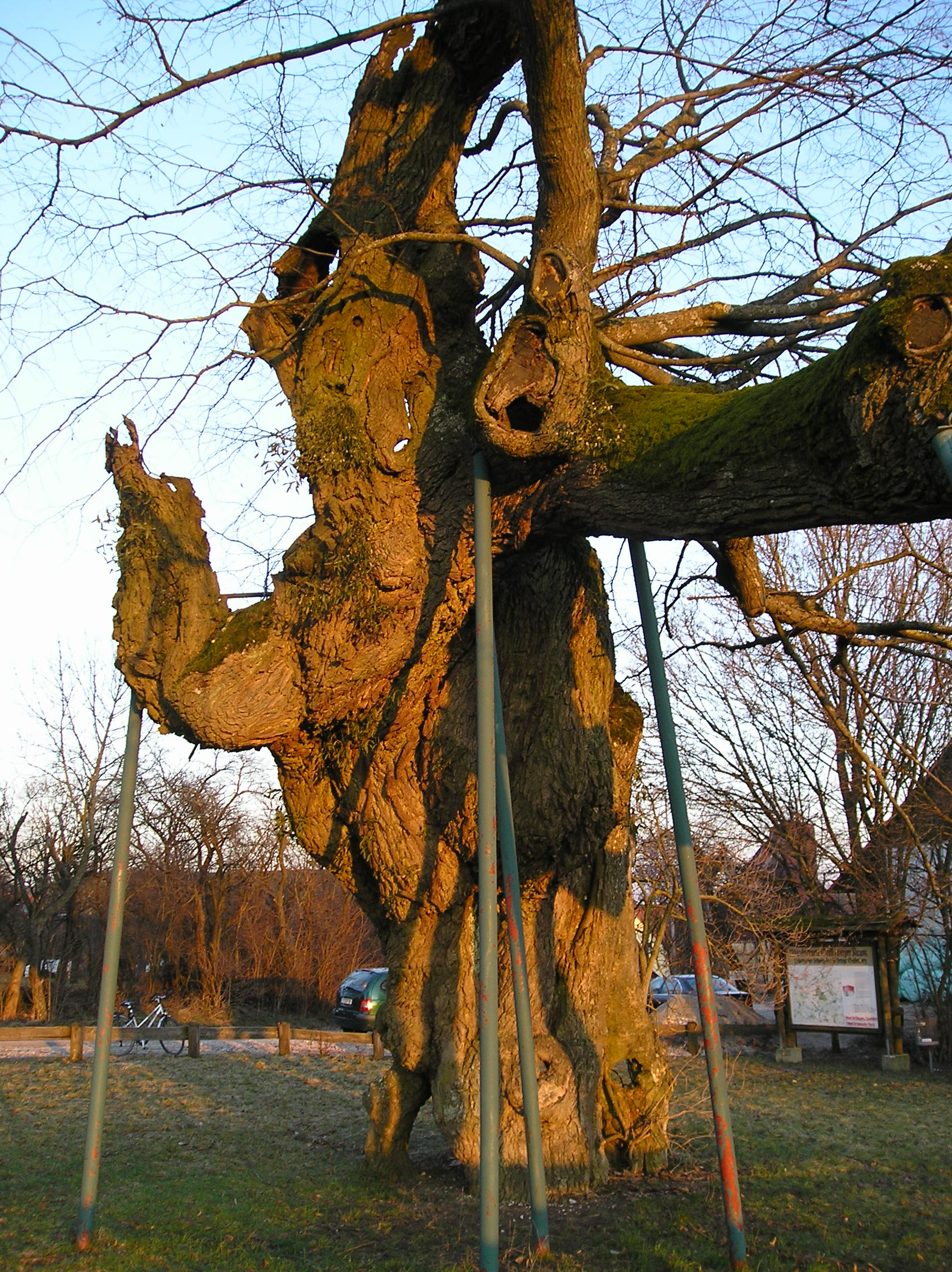
State of the Kasberger lime tree in December 2008

According to legend, St. Empress Cunegonde (Kunigunde von Luxemburg), the wife of Emperor Henry II, either planted the lime tree with her own hands or visited it about 1,000 years ago. Other lime trees in the Franconian region, such as those in Gräfenberg and Burgerroth, located south of Würzburg, were also named after Kunigunde, who has enjoyed a high degree of popularity in Franconia since her canonization by Pope Innocent III in 1200. The chronicle of Gräfenberg from 1850 provides information about the legend of the planting of the Kunigundenlinde (Kunigunden lime tree):

"It is said to have been planted by Kunigunda, the wife of Emperor Henry II, and this planting must have taken place about the year 1008, when Henry was in Bamberg and founded the bishopric there, and when cities began to rise and the free bourgeoisie began to form, through which serfdom was dealt the first powerful blow, and from which freedom gradually spread over the country people."

Until the end of the Middle Ages, court sessions were held in Kasberg for the former rural district of Auerbach in the Upper Palatinate. In the 13th century, for example, the Auerbach magistrate is said to have held a "Schrannengericht" (Schrannen court) with a whole court staff at Kasberg under the open sky near the still-standing lime tree. According to the Kasberg local chronicle of 1920, the Sulzbach magistrate Volkelt von Taun also used the area around the lime tree for court sessions around 1360. However, it is uncertain whether one of the trees mentioned then was today’s Kasberg lime tree.

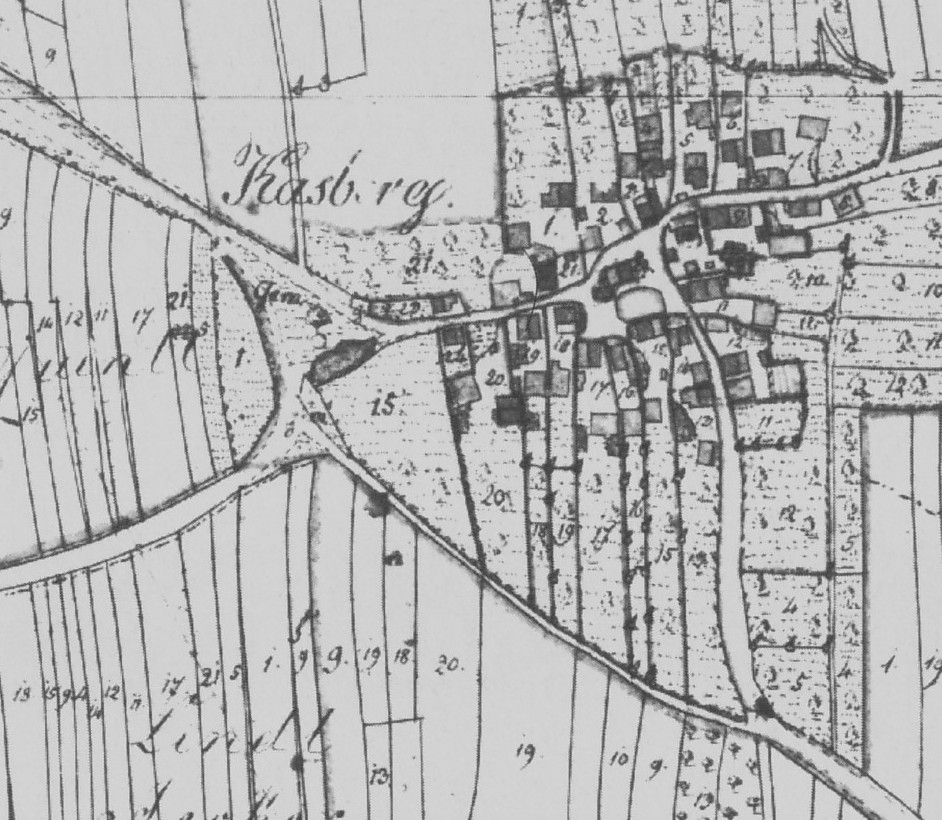
Section with crossroads and village from the field map of Kasberg from 1822

There are various stories and legends about the lime tree from the Revolutionary Wars and the Napoleonic Wars. For instance, during the First Coalition War in 1795, Hungarian soldiers are said to have camped under the lime tree, and a hussar hid in the tree with his horse to avoid detection and escape from enemies. Another tale states that when French troops passed through Kasberg in 1796 under General Jean-Baptiste Jourdan, they fired a cannon at the lime tree, leading to its popular nickname the Franzosenlinde (French Lime Tree).

In the close proximity of Kasberg, battles took place in 1798 between imperial regiments and troops of the French General Augereau. During a march of French soldiers through Kasberg in 1806, the lime tree was set on fire, causing severe damage to the trunk. The fire started under the tree but did not completely destroy it. Despite the damage, the lime tree is still shown on the original survey sheet NW 73-11 from 1822.

On the original survey sheet NW 73-11 from 1822, which was part of the first area-wide survey of Bavaria conducted from 1808 to 1853, the Kasberg lime tree is depicted on the edge of the village at a road junction as a single deciduous tree on a plot of land marked "Gem.[einde]." In the tax sheet N. W. LXXIII, which was re-engraved in 1876, the tree is highlighted as a trigonometric point. It is noteworthy that, in contrast to the present day, the survey sheet depicts unpaved roads reflective of the era.

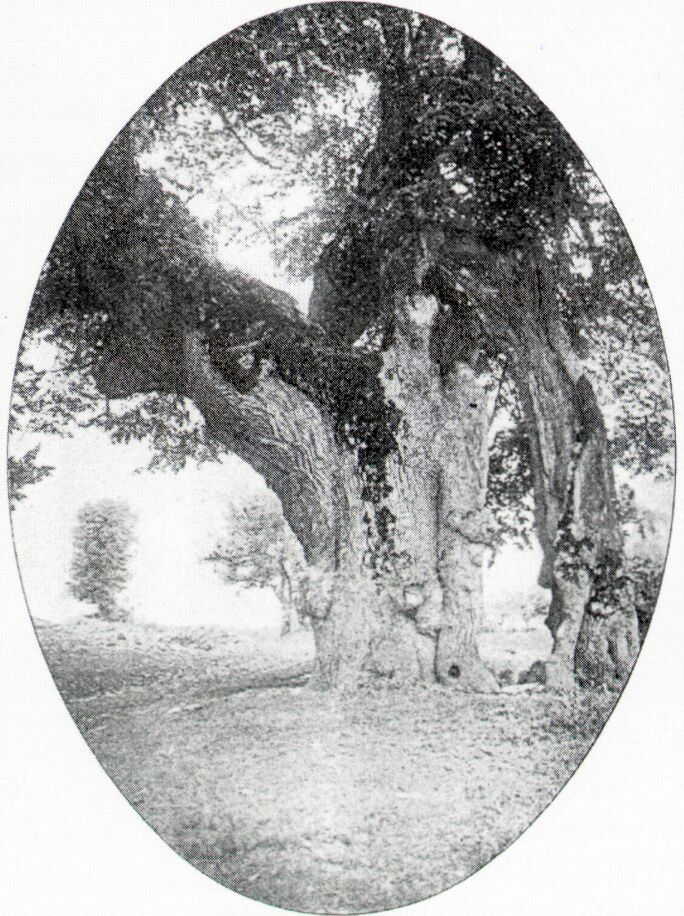
The old Kasberger lime tree around 1900

In 1905, H. Räbel featured an image in the tree book of photographer Friedrich Stützer, portraying the Kasberg lime tree. The photograph displayed a hollow, divided trunk, while the lower section of the crown remained undisturbed. In this context, Räbel mentioned that "about 50 years ago, there were still two large lime trees next to our lime tree" (i.e., around 1850). However, this account contradicts an older document from 1764, the Allgemeines Oekonomisches Forst-Magazin, which only mentioned two mighty lime trees, referred to as the upper and the lower lime. The upper lime tree was described as completely hollow and had already suffered two burnouts. Its circumference was reported to be 45 shoes (13.7 meters), and its height was 60 shoes (18 meters). Extrapolating from these figures, they would correspond to the dimensions of today's lime tree. Nonetheless, according to the German Tree Archive, the lower lime tree, which stood a few steps away, is identified as today's Kasberg lime tree. In 1764, this tree is said to have appeared completely healthy on the outside, with a circumference of 28 shoes (about 8.4 meters) and a height of 70 shoes (21 meters). From the compilation of these details from different times, it becomes evident that different lime trees have been referred to as Old Lime Trees over the centuries.

According to the Gräfenberg chronicle of 1850, the lime tree is believed to be around a thousand years old. It possesses an inner cavity, open on three sides, large enough for a horse to comfortably pass through. The trunk of the lime tree was divided into four pieces and had a circumference of 16 meters. The cavity inside the tree was three meters high, and the average diameter of the lime tree measured 4.5 meters. Its crown had a diameter of 20 meters and the tree itself stood at a height of 12 meters. As per tradition, the people of Kasberg used to dance inside the hollow of the lime tree on festival days, with six dancing couples rotating in the spacious cavity. In the past, there was also reportedly a wooden dancing platform in the crown of the tree.

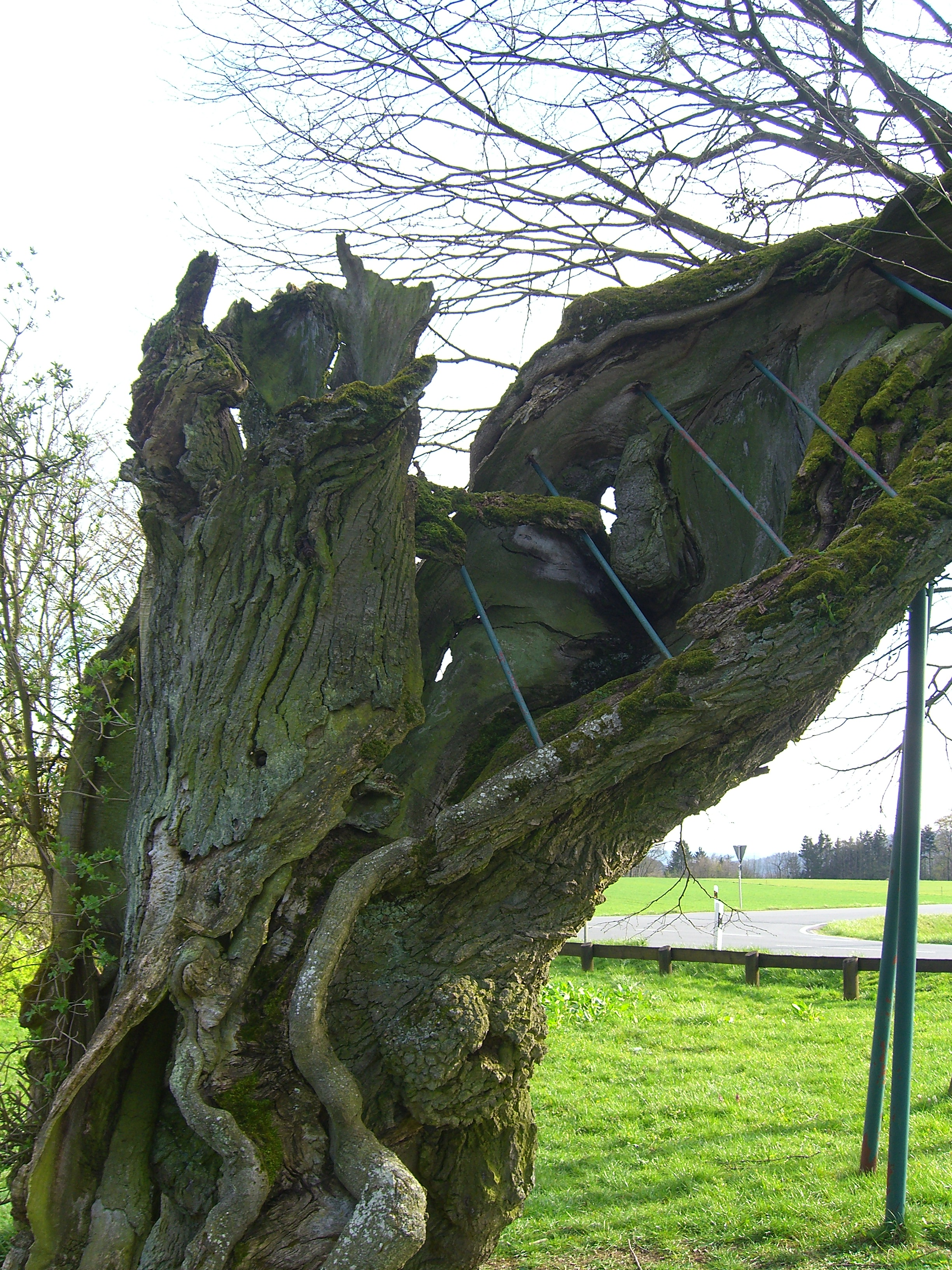
Hollow trunk of old linden tree

During the early 20th century, the lime tree gained national attention due to various reports. In 1902, the Augsburg Abendzeitung published a report about the lime tree, and the same year, the Bamberger Tagblatt also covered the tree in their report. Soon after, the lime tree was featured in a report in the travel guide Die Fränkische Schweiz.

== Rehabilitation attempts ==
In the summer of 1913, a concerted effort was made to slow down the decay of the lime tree, with the district of Upper Franconia and the community of Kasberg jointly covering the expenses. During this restoration project, the branches were supported, the hollow space within the trunk was treated, and a protective fence was erected around the tree. Despite these efforts, the condition of the lime tree continued to deteriorate over the years. In 1970, an appeal for donations was made to fund the renovation of the tree, and in 1976, arborist Michael Maurer from Röthenbach an der Pegnitz was commissioned to carry out the restoration work. The restoration costs amounted to 28,000 German marks.

== More lime trees ==
Adjacent to the old Kasberg lime tree, there is another lime tree estimated to be around 100 to 150 years old. After the eventual demise of the old lime tree, it intended to serve as a prominent replacement, preserving the striking presence of a lime tree in the area.

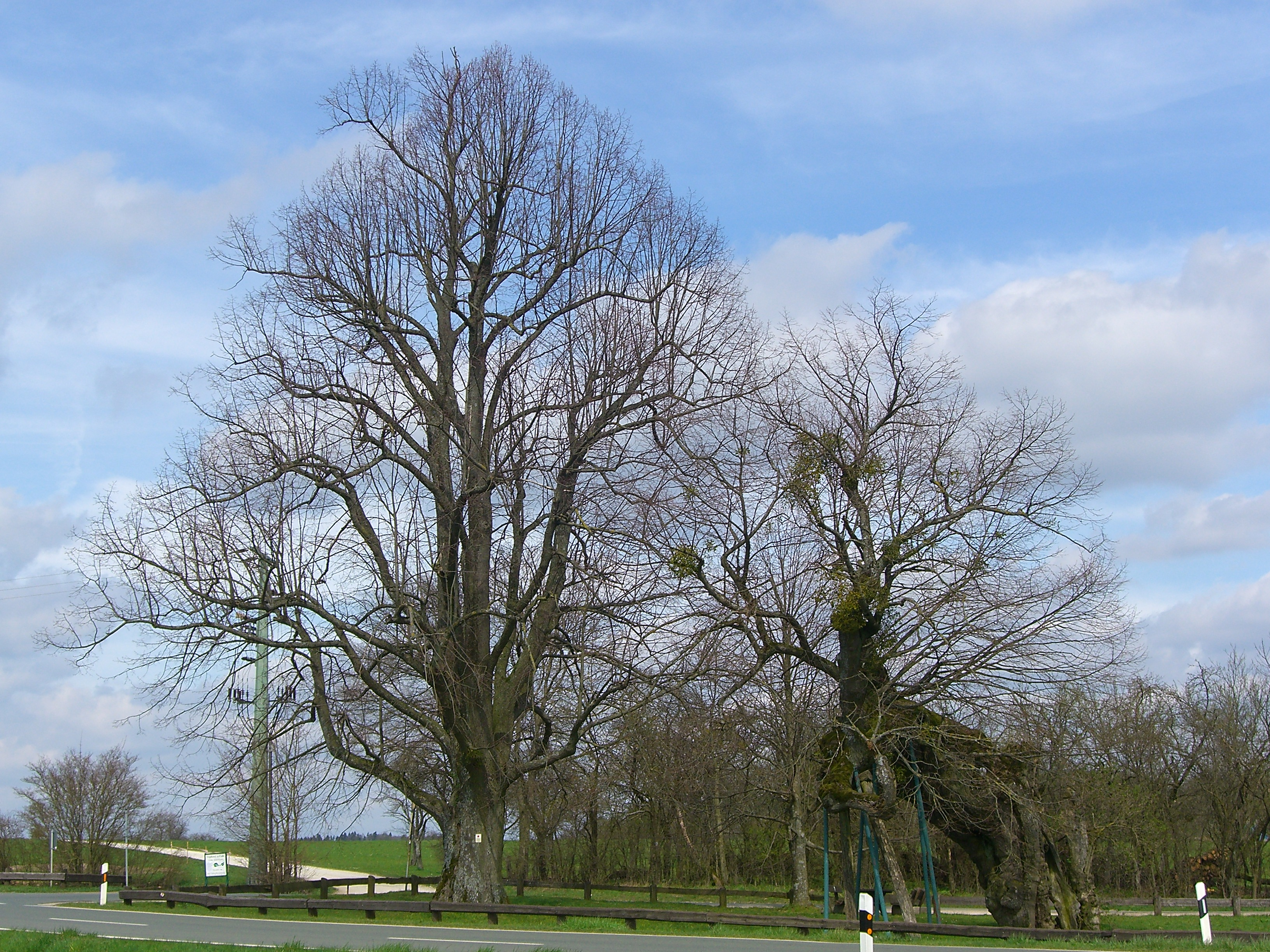
The new (left) and old (right) Kasberger lime tree in May 2007

There are also several old lime trees scattered in and around Kasberg. For instance, there is a lime tree located in the center of Kasberg, believed to be several centuries old. Due to references in the historical literature about an upper and lower lime tree, some confusion may arise. However, it is generally clear that most of the other trees in the vicinity are noticeably smaller in size compared to the tree traditionally known as the Kasberger Linde.
