= Klaus Kreuzeder =

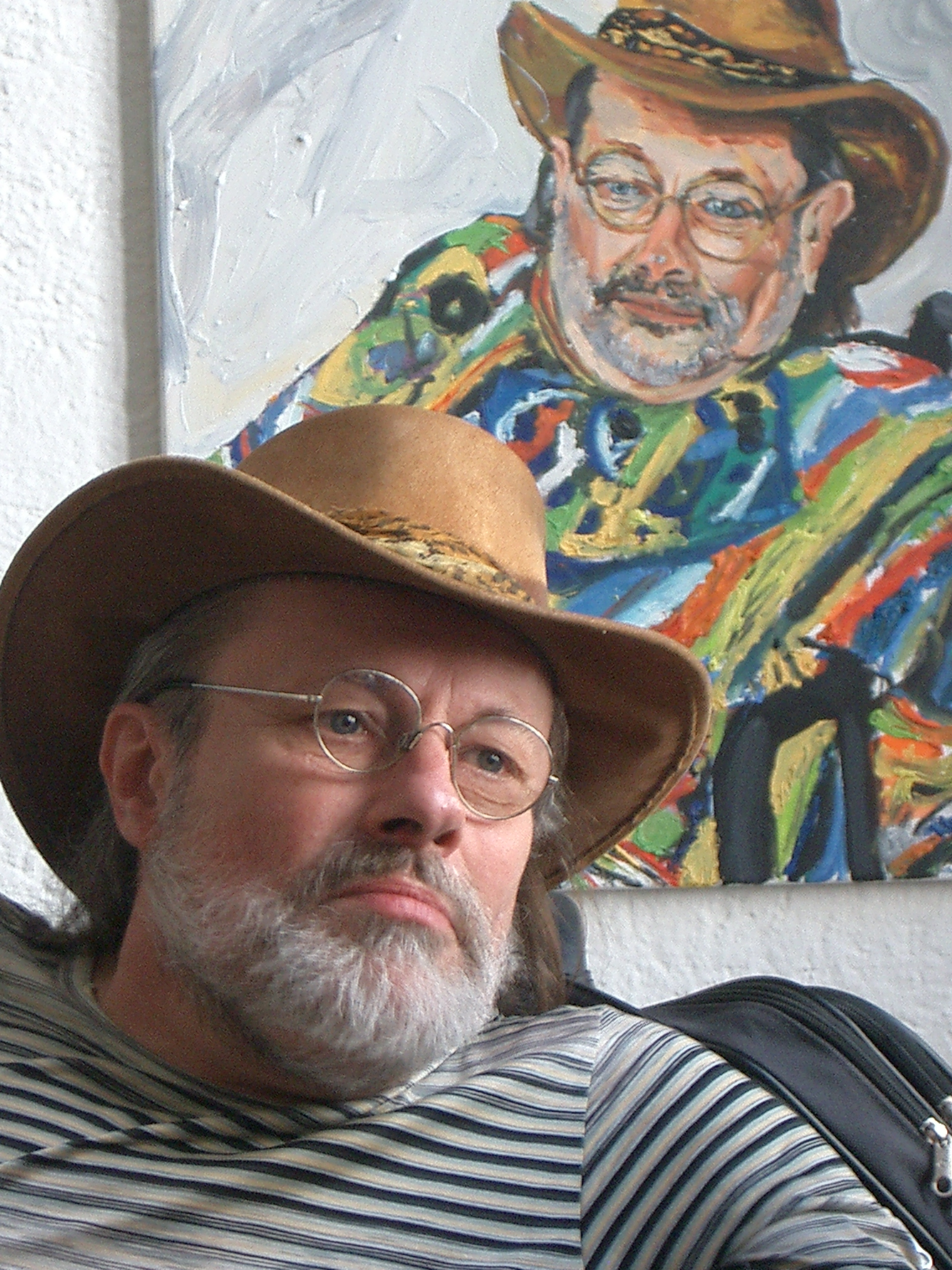
Klaus Kreuzeder 2008 in front of a portrait painting by Kai Feldschur

Klaus Kreuzeder (German pronunciation: [klaʊs ˈkrɔʏtsʔeːdɐ], 4 April 1950 in Forchheim, West Germany – 3 November 2014 in Munich, Germany) was a German saxophonist.

== Life ==
Klaus Kreuzeder was born in Forchheim, West Germany in 1950 and grew up in Altdorf near Nuremberg. Since contracting polio at the age of one and a half years, he used a wheelchair.

Kreuzeder had a professional music career for more than 30 years. In 1971, he appeared live with the band Ex Ovo Pro at the Free Open Air Festival Hoehn, near Coburg. He went on to become a member of the Jazz Rock band Aera, with whom he performed as a professional musician from 1973 through 1982, also acting as booking agent and de facto band leader. When Aera disbanded, Kreuzeder suddenly found himself "stranded", facing massive debt and financial liabilities as high as DM 70,000. In the documentary referenced below, he explained that his physical disability left him with a very small range of options finding a conventional day job. Therefore he eventually decided to make a living by busking, performing music in public places and inner city shopping areas. He was joined by guitarist Willi Herzinger and the two rose to some local fame with their street-bound performances, which were praised by audiences as being of the highest musical level. In 1984 Kreuzeder played four concerts joining Stevie Wonder on stage.

1985 marks the making of the first documentary for movie theaters "Grand Slam" (rated "highly valuable" by critics) and the beginning of a collaboration with Eberhard Schoener for ARD-Klassik-Rocknacht. In the same year, music producer Steve Leistner added Kreuzeder to his roster of artists and began producing Sax as Sax Can's first CD. In 1986, Kreuzeder received the city of Munich's Kulturpreis award and in that same year Bayerischer Rundfunk produced a 45 minute TV documentary titled "Diesseits von Eden". In 1987 Kreuzeder shared the stage with Stevie Wonder, David Sanborn, Jack Bruce, Gianna Nannini and Sting. The Sax as Sax Can CD was published that year, followed by many live performances of the duo. In 1988, Kreuzeder was joined by guitarist Henry Sincigno and after some 50 live concerts the two began producing their sophomore CD Saxappeal, which was published in 1990 followed by numerous live and TV performances thus establishing the two-piece act as a household name in the music industry. Kreuzeder also shared the stage with artists like Konstantin Wecker, Bill Withers and Al Di Meola.

In 1999, Leistner's music label Trick Music released a "Best of Kreuzeder" album. As a proponent of the burgeoning inclusion movement in Germany, Kreuzeder performed six concerts at the Paralympics in Atlanta in 2000.

In 2002 Klaus Kreuzeder became a member of the Miro Nemec Band and often appeared with them year round. Band leader Miroslav Nemec had risen to popularity due to his part as detective chief superintendent "Ivo Batic" in the German TV crime series Tatort. The two had also become personal friends in addition to performing together. Notable performances included a concert at Bellevue Palace for the German Federal President.

At the age of 60, in 2010, Kreuzeder published his autobiography entitled Glück gehabt, which roughly translates "Lucky Me".

The progression of his post-polio syndrome symptoms, aggravated by a cancer diagnosis, resulted in several near-fatal collapses of his system. His deteriorating condition forced him to terminate his career as a professional musician in 2013. Kreuzeder had continued to author another autobiography and a DVD until his death. Both works were due for publication in 2015.

== Awards ==
- 1986 Kulturpreis der Stadt Muenchen
- 1998 Oberbayerischer Kulturpreis
- 2007 Life Award für Menschen mit einem Handicap in der Kategorie Lebenswerk
- 2009 Schwabinger Kunstpreis
- 2010 Kulturpreis der Bayerischen Landesstiftung

== Literature ==
- Klaus Kreuzeder Glück gehabt. Autobiografie. München (Langen Müller) 2010
