= Terushima Cormorant Habitat =

Island off the coast of Japan

Coordinates: 36°54′48″N 140°51′01″E

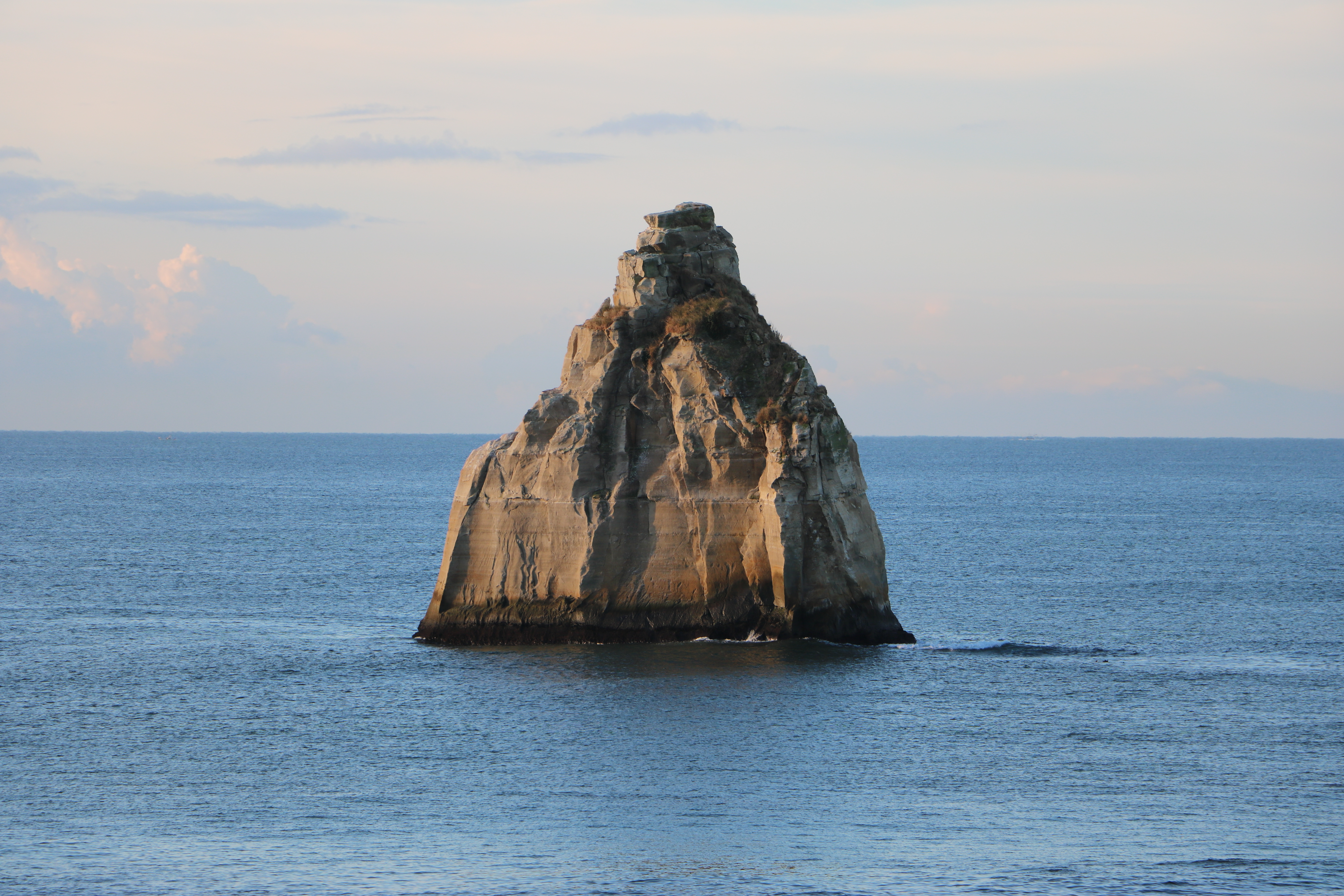
Tersuhima

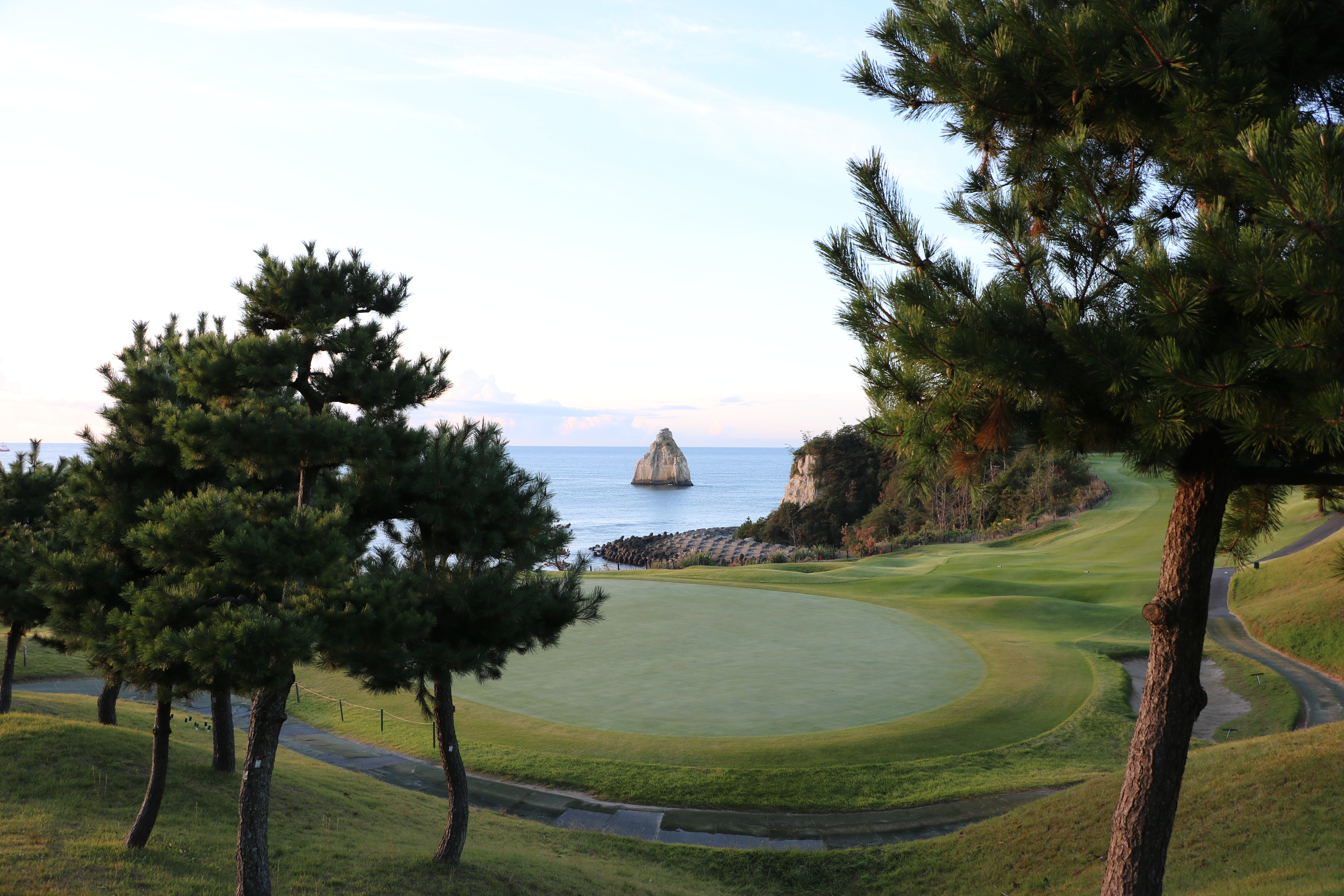
Terushima Cormorant Habitat seen over the green of Onahama Ocean Golf Club. Photographed on October 25, 2023

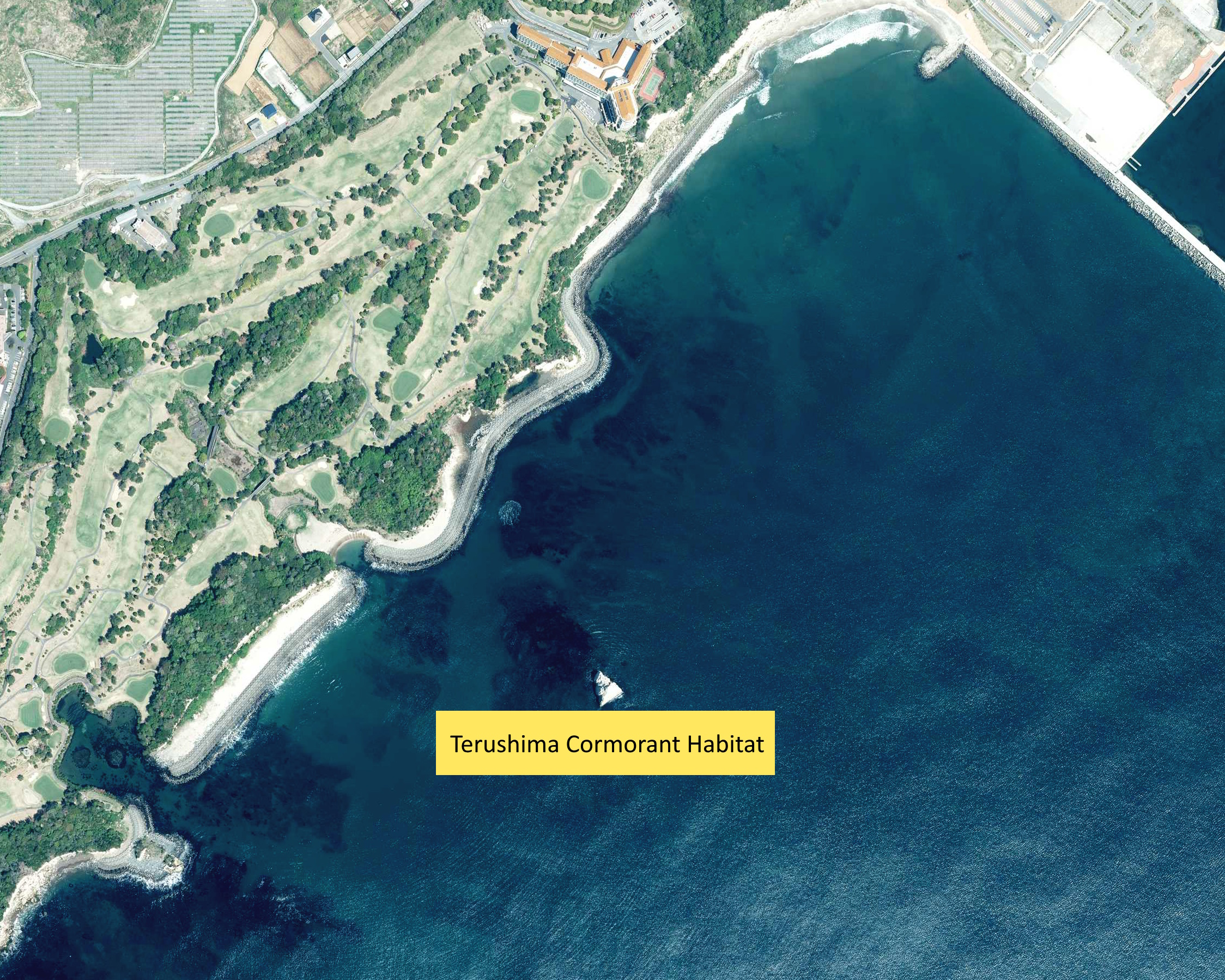
Aerial photo of Terushima Cormorant Habitat. It is more like a reef than an island. Created based on aerial photos from the Map and Aerial Photo Viewing Service of the Geospatial Information Authority of Japan, Ministry of Land, Infrastructure, Transport and Tourism. (Created using images taken on April 28, 2019)

Terushima Cormorant Habitat (照島ウ生息地, Terushima U Seisokuchi) is located in Shimokawa, Izumi-cho, Iwaki, Fukushima Prefecture, and is a habitat for Japanese cormorants designated as a national natural monument. Terushima is a small island made of tuffaceous sandstone with a cliff of 31 meters in height, located approximately 250 meters offshore from the coast of the mainland. It was designated as a national natural monument on February 22, 1945, under the third category of the designation criteria for animals: "animal or animal group unique to the natural environment."

Location of Terushima in Japan

The Japanese cormorant (Phalacrocorax capillatus) is a bird classified in the genus Cormorant, in the order Suliformes, and is known for its use in the traditional fishing method of cormorant fishing in Japan. They mainly live near the coast, and their habitat and breeding grounds in Japan range from the north of Honshu to the Hokkaido coast, as well as islands and cape reefs in northern Honshu. In the winter, they migrate to southwestern Honshu to overwinter. Terushima is located at the southernmost tip of the Tohoku region on the Pacific side, and they usually fly there from October to November and stay on the rocky area of the island, returning to the north of Japan around March to April of the following year, but some visit Terushima throughout the year. Some resident birds are seen, and a small number of these are known to breed on Terushima.

== Geography ==
Terushima, where Terushima Cormorant Habitat is located, is a small rock-shaped island positioned in the sea southeast of Iwaki City, Fukushima Prefecture, and is located on the southwest side of Onahama Port, known as the largest port in Fukushima Prefecture. It is located approximately 250 meters offshore from the border between Obama-cho and Izumi-cho in Shimokawa in the same city. The height from the sea is approximately 31 meters, which is almost the same as the relative height of the cliffs on the mainland side on the opposite shore. Today's Terushima was originally connected to the mainland, but due to wave erosion, it was separated from the other side and became an island.

== Access ==
Location: 260 Ohata, Shimokawa, Izumi-cho, Iwaki City, Fukushima Prefecture.

- Approximately 20 minutes by car from Iwaki Nakoso Interchange on the Jōban Expressway.
- Approximately 15 minutes by car from Izumi Station on the JR Jōban Line.
