= El Hotzo =

German comedian

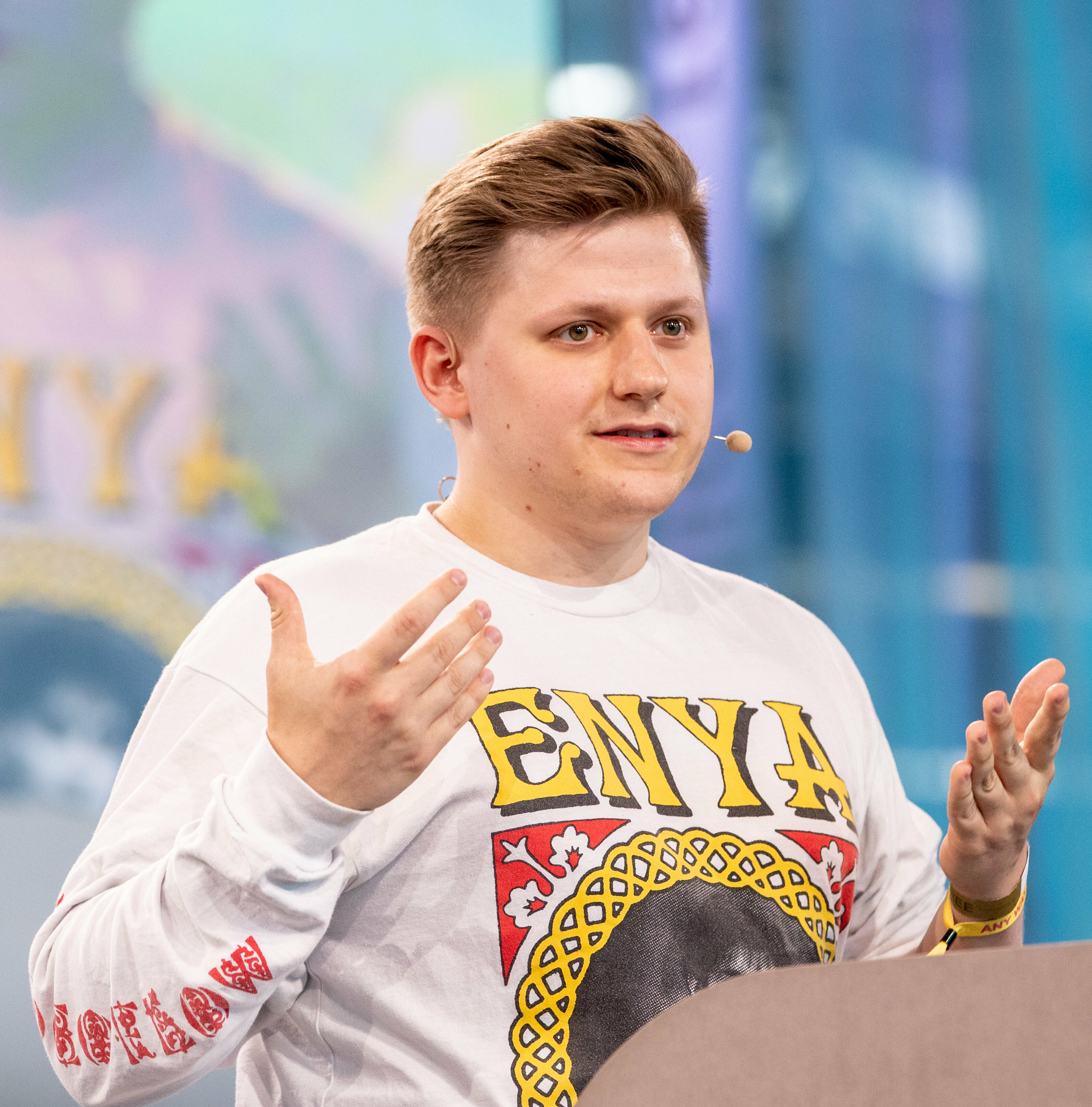
El Hotzo at re:publica 2022 in Berlin

Sebastian Hotz (born 16 January 1996 in Forchheim), usually appearing as El Hotzo, is a German satirist and podcaster.

== Career ==
Posting as El Hotzo, Hotz first reached public attention via his humorous and satirical tweets and Instagram posts. His posts focus on social criticism and political satire.

In response to the attempted assassination of Donald Trump in July 2024, Hotz published tweets expressing sorrow that Trump was "unfortunately narrowly missed" and that he found it "absolutely fantastic when fascists die". As a consequence, the Berlin broadcast network RBB ended his radio show.

== Charges and Acquittal ==
In 2025, he was acquitted by a court in Berlin on charges of hate crimes and disturbing public peace related to the tweets.

== Publications ==
- Paris, London, Mailand, Willingen: Wandern ist nur Spazierengehen aber wütend. starfruit publications, Fürth 2021, ISBN 978-3-922895-45-9 (with his partner Max Sand).
- Mindset Verlag Kiepenheuer & Witsch, Köln 2023, ISBN 978-3-462-00284-3
