= Forchheim =

- Town
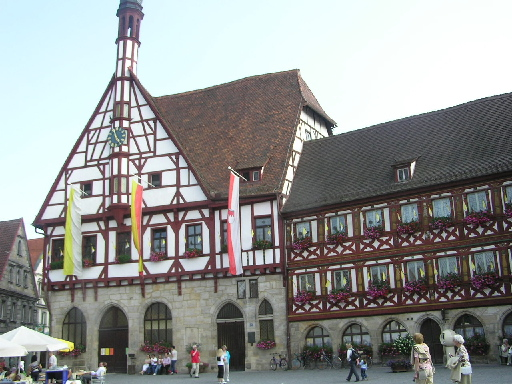
- City hall

- Coat of arms

- Location of Forchheim within Forchheim district
- Interactive map of Forchheim
- Location within Germany Location within Bavaria
- Coordinates: 49°43′11″N 11°03′29″E
- Country: Germany
- State: Bavaria
- Admin. region: Oberfranken
- District: Forchheim

Government
  - Mayor (2020–26): Uwe Kirschstein (SPD)

Area
  - Total: 44.44 km^{2} (17.16 sq mi)
- Elevation: 266 m (873 ft)

Population (2025-12-31)
  - Total: 33,359
  - Density: 750.7/km^{2} (1,944/sq mi)
- Time zone: UTC+01:00 (CET)
  - Summer (DST): UTC+02:00 (CEST)
- Postal codes: 91301
- Dialling codes: 09191
- Vehicle registration: FO, EBS, PEG
- Website: www.forchheim.de

Forchheim (German pronunciation: [ˈfɔʁçhaɪm]) is a town in Upper Franconia (German: Oberfranken) in northern Bavaria, and also the seat of the administrative district of Forchheim. Forchheim is a former royal city, and is sometimes called the Gateway to the Franconian Switzerland, referring to the region of outstanding natural beauty to the north east of the town. Nowadays Forchheim is most famous for its ten day long beer and music festival (Annafest) which takes place in late July in an idyllic wooded hillside, home to 24 beer gardens, on the outskirts of the town. Forchheim's population, as of December 2013, was 30,705, and its land area is 44.95 square kilometres (17.36 square miles). Its position is 49° 44' N, 11° 04' E and its elevation is 265 metres (869 feet) above sea level.

== Name and coat of arms ==
When the coat of arms was bestowed upon the town at the beginning of the 13th century, people wrongly believed that their town's name, "Vorchheim" originates from the Old High German word vorhe (“trout”). This resulted in the coat of arms showing two trout (above). Although the rivers around the town were certainly home to a great number of trout in those days, it seems likelier that the town's name was actually derived from the Old High German word vorha, forha (Föhre=“pine”). Hence, the name means “pine home” with a probability bordering on certainty.

The name most likely originates in the 7th century, when Frankish settlers first ensconced themselves in the region. They established many riverside towns with names ending in –heim.

== Transport connections ==
Forchheim is directly connected to the Autobahn network by way of the A 73, via 2 Exits Forchheim-Nord and Forchheim-Süd.

Through Forchheim run Federal Highways (Bundesstraßen) B 470. In 2011, the former B 4 which also ran through Forchheim was downgraded to a regional road because of its parallelity concerning the regional importance to the Autobahn A 73.

Rail traffic from the station goes towards Bamberg, Nuremberg and Ebermannstadt. The railway line to Höchstadt was permanently closed on 1 April 2005. Since 2010, Forchheim is also connected to the Nuremberg S-Bahn; work began on this project in 2006.

Local public transportation, such as buses and hailed shared taxis, is incorporated into the Greater Nuremberg transport area.

The city lies right on the Rhine-Main-Danube Canal and lies roughly 30 minutes from Nuremberg Airport.

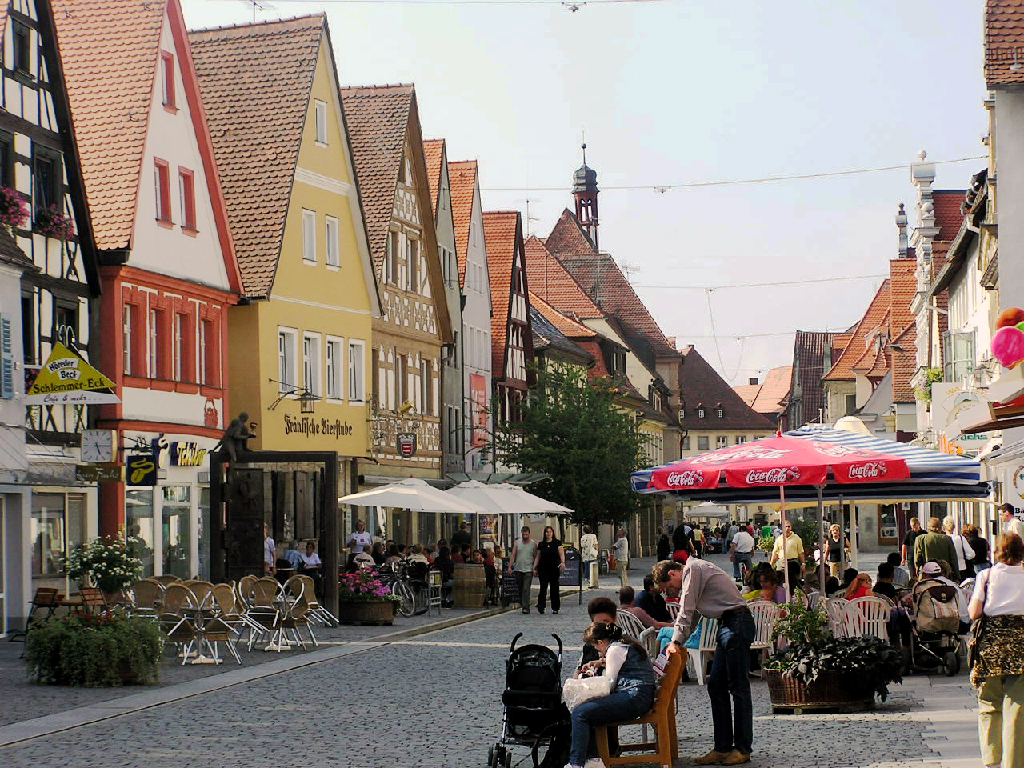
Hauptstraße (pedestrian precinct)

== Neighborhoods ==
- Buckenhofen (on the left bank of the Regnitz; first mentioned in documents in 1251, but likely older; has about 4,500 inhabitants)
- Burk (likely older than the town itself; known for its Dreikönigskirche {Three Kings Church, i.e. the three wise men/magi}, the only one so dedicated in the whole diocese of Bamberg)
- Kersbach with Sigritzau
- Reuth
- Serlbach (northeast of Forchheim; its name is a corruption of an older name, Zum Erlebach)

== History ==
In the 8th century, a royal court and a palace were built in Forchheim.

In 805, the town was mentioned in the Diedenhofener Kapitular, a capitulary (royal order) from Charlemagne forbidding the two towns that it named – Magdeburg was the other – to trade weapons with the Slavs, issued at Diedenhofen (now Thionville, France). This is the first documentary evidence of the town's existence.

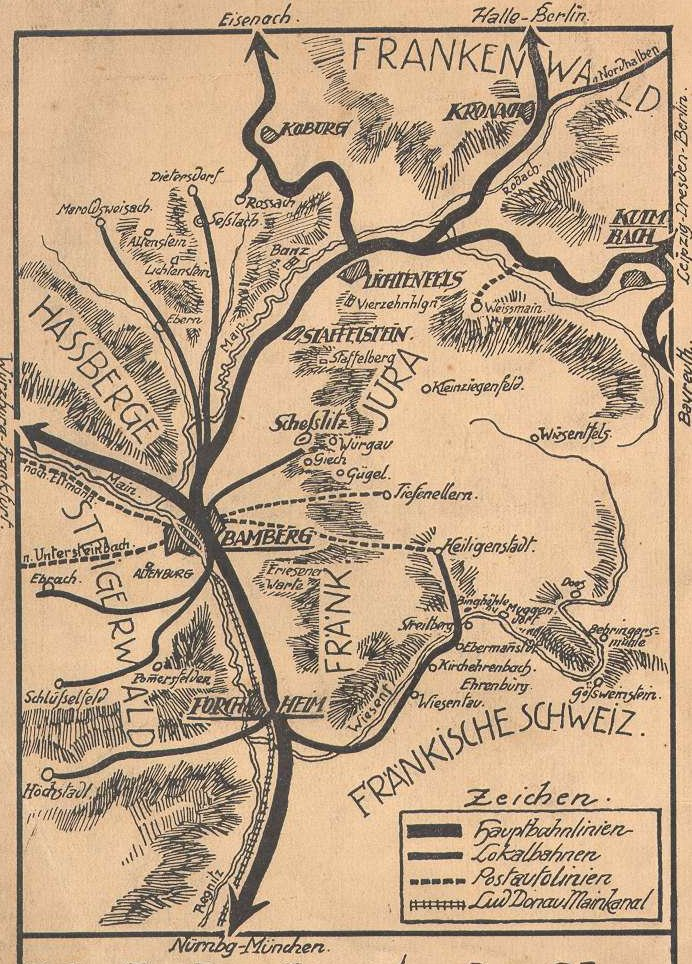
Travel map from 1912 with Forchheim near bottom

In the following centuries, Forchheim saw many imperial diets and princely gatherings. On 10 November, 911, Conrad I was elected and crowned the first "German" king.

On 1 November 1007, Emperor Heinrich II granted Forchheim, then under Crown ownership, the Bishopric of Bamberg. By 1039, however, Emperor Heinrich III had brought the town back under Imperial administration until it was finally made part of the Bishopric of Bamberg on 13 July 1063, a status which lasted up until the secularization in 1802–1803.

In Heinrich IV's time, Rudolf von Rheinfelden was chosen to be the Gegenkönig ("anti-king") on 15 March 1077, in Forchheim.

Sometime between 1200 and 1220, Forchheim was raised to the status of a city, and was granted its current coat of arms.

Owing to Forchheim's fortifications, it got through the Thirty Years' War without being overrun even once. The Prince-Bishop of Bamberg fled the Swedes in this war, seeking shelter for himself, and also for his cathedral treasure, in the strongly defended fortress town of Forchheim. The Swedes laid siege to the town several times from 1632 to 1634. It was also in this era of Forchheim's history that some of the townsfolk earned the rather unflattering nickname Mauerscheißer ("wall shitters"). This came from their practice of defecating over the city walls during the siege, to demonstrate to the Swedes that there was still enough to eat in the city, and that their siege was ineffective and pointless.

On 6 September 1802, Forchheim was occupied by Bavarian troops and annexed to the Electorate of Bavaria.

In 1889, Forchheim became a kreisfreie Stadt, conferring on it certain enhanced local powers. It lost this status in 1972 under Bavarian regional government reform, and was united with Landkreis Forchheim, the local district. Since then its title is Große Kreisstadt.

=== Today ===
In 2005, Forchheim celebrated its 1,200th anniversary of first documentary mention, on the occasion of which the Deutsche Post (German Post) issued special commemorative stamps worth 45 cents. In 2004, the city played host to the Bavarian provincial Exhibition. There were about 199,100 visitors.

== Things to see ==
- Rathaus (City Hall), 14th–16th centuries with décor by Hans Ruhalm, 1523.
- Kaiserpfalz, prince-bishop's palace, 14th century.
- Martinskirche (church), 12th–15th centuries.
- Marienkapelle (chapel), 12th century.
- Festungsmauer (fortification wall), 1560–1750 with mediaeval Saltorturm (tower).
- Kammerersmühle (a quaintly leaning old mill, now used as a wine bar), 17th century. Das schiefe Haus
- Katharinenspital (hospital), 1611 and Spitalkirche (hospital church), 1490
- Klosterkirche and Kloster (monastery church, and monastery) 17th century.
- Stadtpark (Citypark), surrounded by the old city wall, big grassed area.

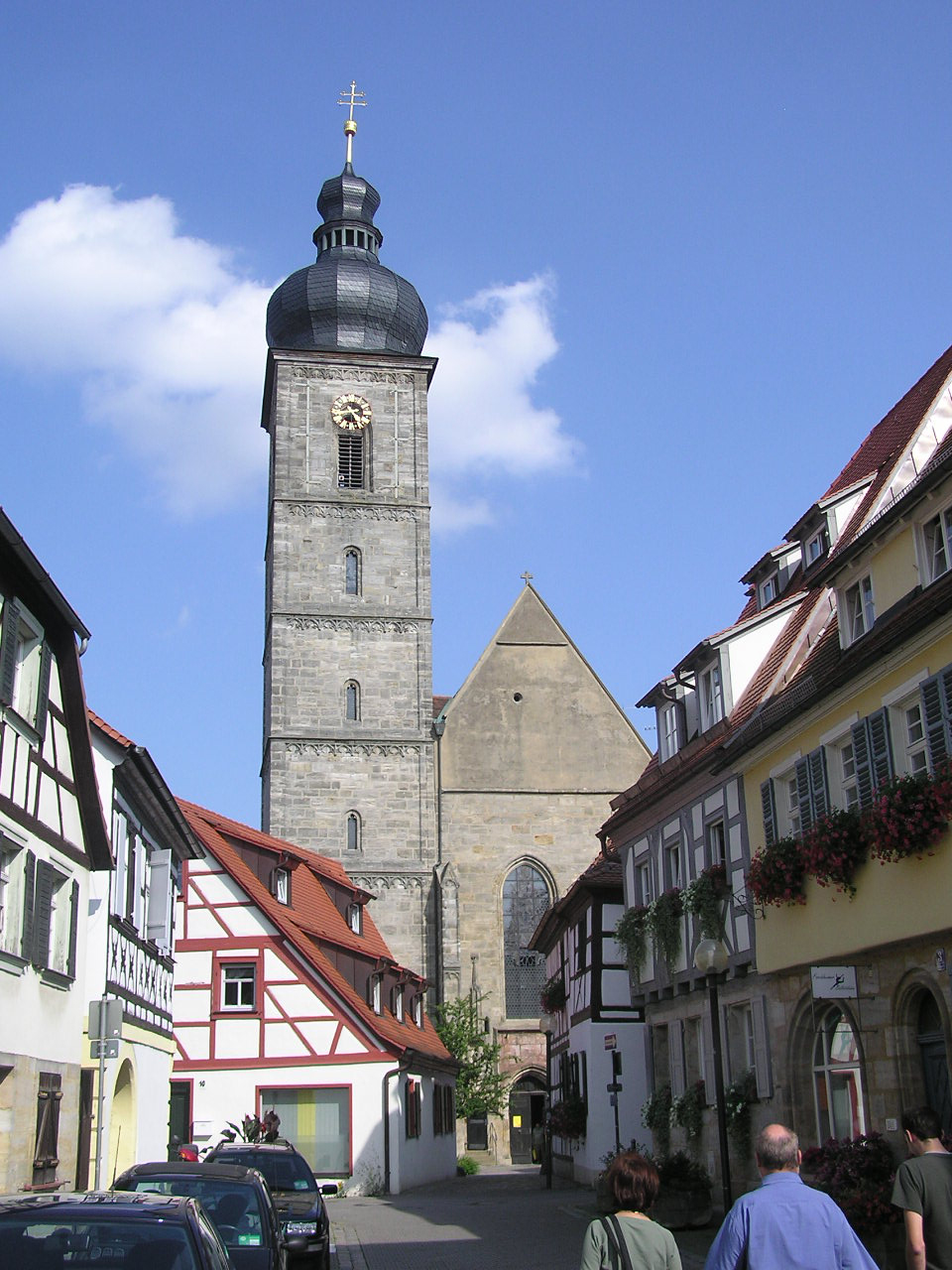
Martinskirche

== Regular events ==
- January/February: Carnival festival and Carnival parade
- April/May: Theatertage (“Theatre days”)
- June: Altstadtfest (“Old Town Festival“)
- July/August: Annafest
- December: Schönster Adventskalender der Welt (“World’s loveliest Advent calendar”)and actually the biggest one in the world (Entry in the "World Guinness Book Records")

As well as those events, Forchheim offers a number of different festivals around the year. Africafestival, Streetmusicfestival, Winefestival or even some special Neighborhood- or Street festivals with live music are common.

The so-called "Jahn Halle", a kind of "Townhall," offers live music performances during the year.

== Economy ==
Forchheim's economy is mainly shaped by its proximity to Nuremberg.

In Forchheim, the Siemens company runs a large site for production and development of medical devices, particularly for computed tomography. Together with the company's sites in Erlangen and Nuremberg, it is part of the "Siemens' Medical Valley".

There is a famous pedestrian precinct downtown (see picture above). Plenty of shops, restaurants and cafés can be found there, as well as cultural and architectural artwork.

== Twin towns – sister cities ==
Forchheim is twinned with:

- Broumov, Czech Republic
- Gherla, Romania
- Le Perreux-sur-Marne, France
- Pößneck, Germany
- Roppen, Austria
- Rovereto, Italy

== Notable people ==
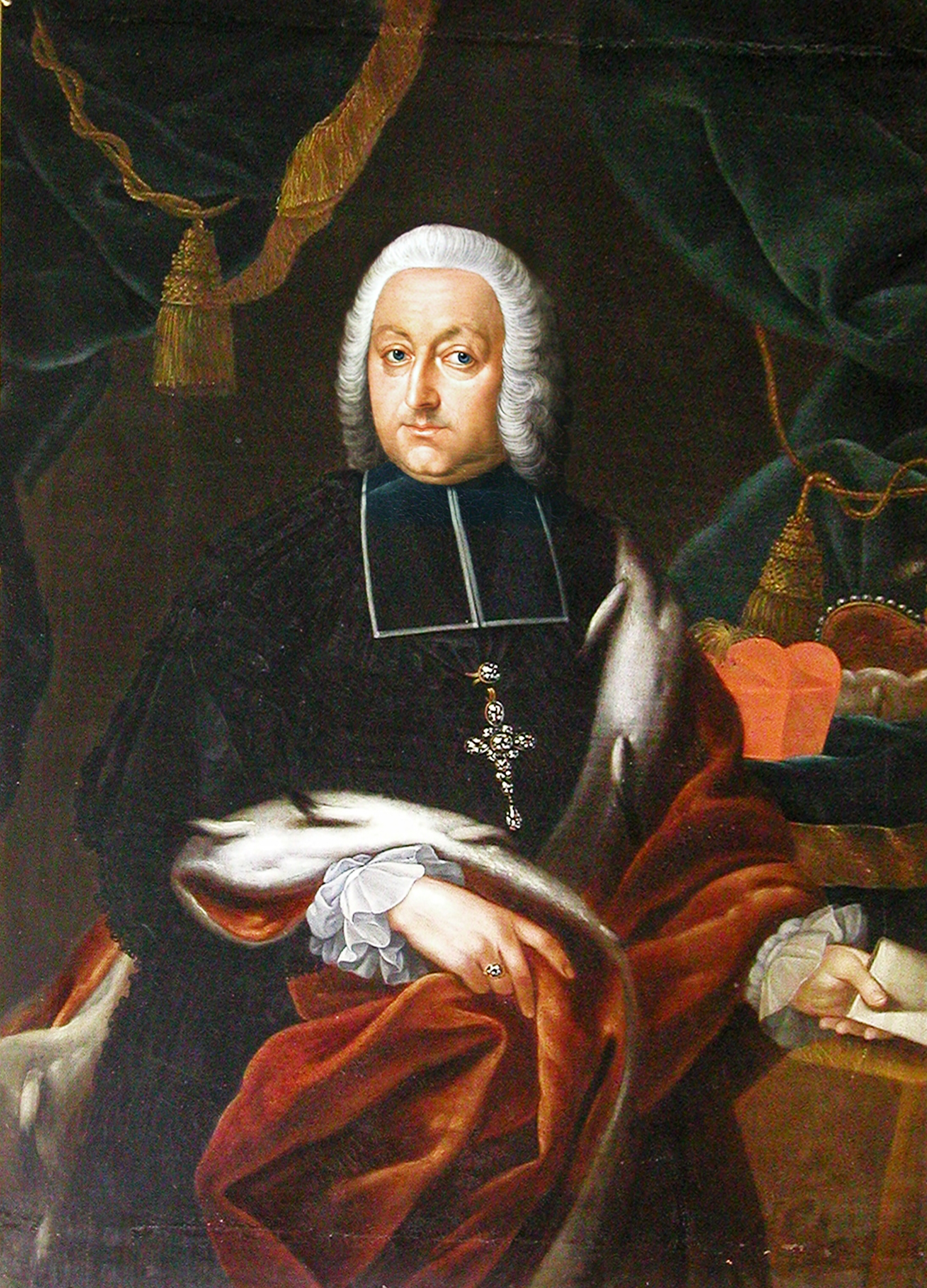
Johann Philipp Anton von Franckenstein

- Johannes Fabri (died 1480), Roman Catholic theologian
- Johann Salver (around 1670–1738), copper cutters
- Johann Philipp Anton von Franckenstein (1695–1753), bishop
- Hilmar Wäckerle (1899–1941), National Socialist, first commander of Dachau Concentration Camp
- Wolfgang Droege (1949–2005), Canadian-German right-wing extremist
- Klaus Kreuzeder (1950–2014), saxophonist
- Horst Kummeth (born 1956), actor, director and author
- Mustafa Özkan (born 1975), German-Turkish footballer
- Roberto Hilbert (born 1984), footballer
- Andreas Sponsel (born 1986), soccer goalkeeper
- El Hotzo (born 1996), satirist
- Moritz Löhner (born 1998), racing driver

== See also ==
Harald Winter, (born 1953), artist

Kasberger Linde
