= Andreas Sponsel =

German footballer

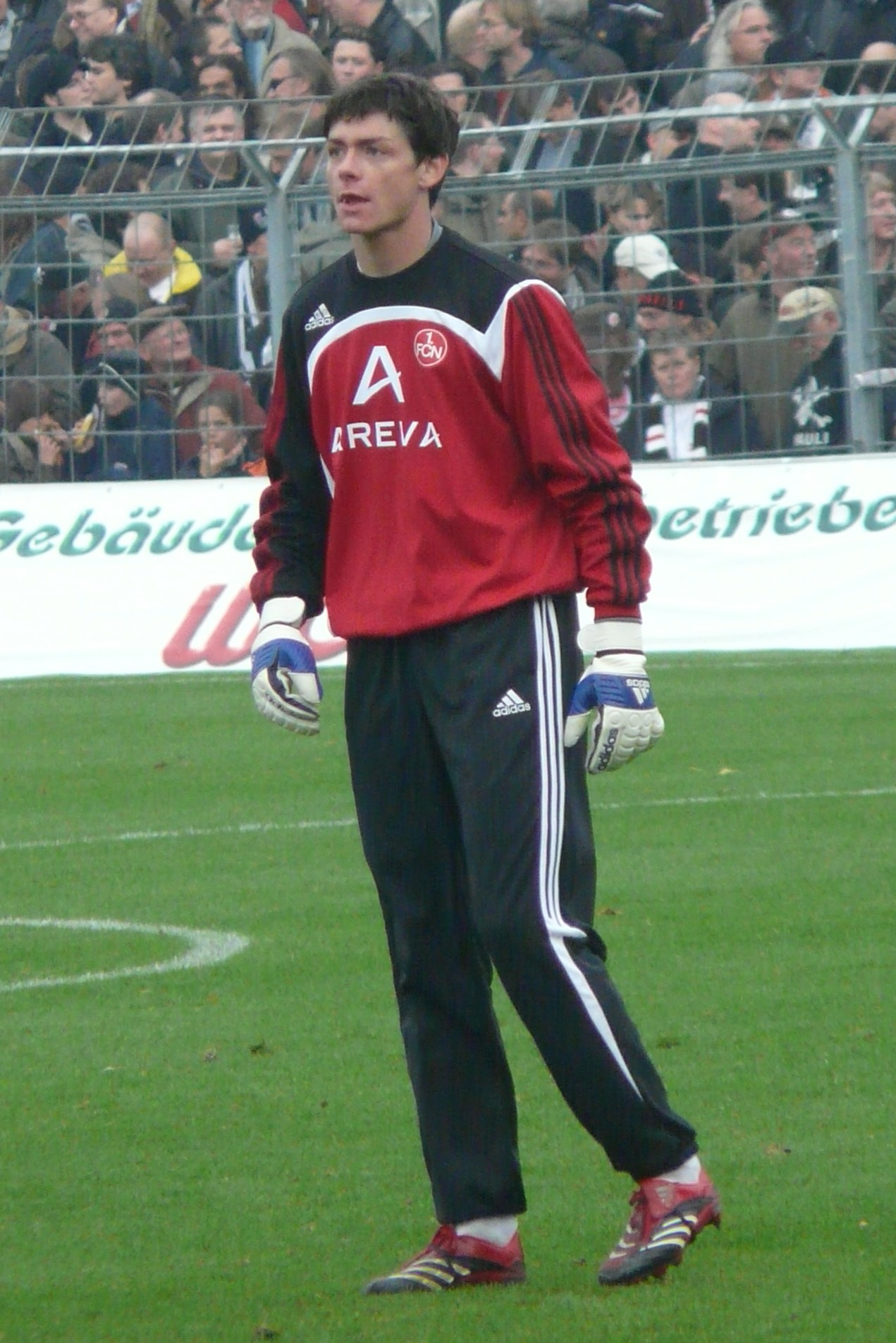

Personal information
- Date of birth: 3 March 1986 (age 40)
- Place of birth: Forchheim, West Germany
- Height: 1.93 m (6 ft 4 in)
- Position: Goalkeeper

Youth career
- TSV Gräfenberg
- –2005: 1. FC Nürnberg

Senior career*
Years	Team	Apps	(Gls)
2005–2009	1. FC Nürnberg II	26	(0)
2009–2013	Rot-Weiss Erfurt	52	(0)
2013–2016	SpVgg Bayreuth		
2016–2017	1. SC Feucht		
- * Club domestic league appearances and goals as of 30 June 2013

Andreas Sponsel (born 3 March 1986) is a German footballer who plays as a goalkeeper.

== Career ==
Sponsel began his career with 1. FC Nürnberg, where he played in the youth and reserve team before joining Rot-Weiss Erfurt in 2009. In his first two seasons he served as understudy to Dirk Orlishausen, but after Orlishausen left for Karlsruher SC in 2011 he shared first-choice goalkeeping duties with Marcus Rickert until Rickert's departure in January 2013. He left Erfurt six months later to return to Bavaria to sign for SpVgg Bayreuth.
