= Rittmeyer =

Rittmeyer is a surname. Notable people with the surname include:

- Immo Rittmeyer (1936–2024), German cyclist
- Nico Rittmeyer (born 1993), American-born Guatemalan soccer player
