= List of bishops and archbishops of Bamberg =

This is a list of bishops and archbishops of the Prince-Bishopric of Bamberg and the modern Archdiocese of Bamberg in Germany.

== Bishops, 1007–1245 ==
- Eberhard I 1007-1040
- Suidger von Morsleben 1040-1046 (Later Pope Clement II)
- Hartwig von Bogen 1047-1053
- Adalbert of Carinthia 1053-1057
- Günther 1057-1065
- Herman I 1065-1075
- Rupprecht 1075-1102
- Otto I of Mistelbach 1102-1139
- Egilbert 1139-1146
- Eberhard II von Otelingen 1146-1170
- Hermann II von Aurach 1170-1177
- Otto II of Andechs 1177-1196
- Thimo von Lyskirch 1196-1201
- Konrad von Ergersheim 1202-1203
- Ekbert of Andechs 1203-1231
- Siegfried von Öttingen 1231-1238
- Poppo of Andechs 1238-1242
- Heinrich I von Bilversheim 1242-1245, continued as Prince-Bishop

== Prince-Bishops, 1245–1802 ==
- Heinrich I von Bilversheim 1245-1257, bishop since 1242
- Wladislaw of Silesia 1257
- Berthold von Leiningen 1257-1285
- Mangold von Neuenburg 1285 (Bishop of Würzburg 1287-1303)
- Arnold von Solms 1286-1296
- Leopold I von Grundlach 1296-1303
- Wulfing von Stubenberg 1304-1318
- Ulrich von Schlusselberg 1319
- Konrad von Giech 1319-1322
- Johannes von Schlackenwerth 1322-1324
- Heinrich II von Sternberg 1324-1328
- Werntho Schenk von Reicheneck 1328-1335
- Leopold II von Egloffstein 1335-1343
- Friedrich I von Hohenlohe 1344-1352
- Leopold III of Bebenburg 1353-1363
- Friedrich II von Truhendingen 1363-1366
- Louis of Meissen 1366-1374
- Lamprecht von Brunn 1374-1399
- Albrecht von Wertheim 1399-1421
- Friedrich III von Aufsess 1421-1431
- Anton von Rotenhan 1431-1459
- Georg I von Schaumberg 1459-1475
- Philipp von Henneberg 1475-1487
- Heinrich Groß von Trockau 1487-1501
- Veit Truchseß von Pommersfelden 1501-1503
- Georg Marschalk von Ebnet 1503-1505
- Georg Schenk von Limpurg 1505-1522
- Weigand von Redwitz 1522-1556
- Georg Fuchs von Rügheim 1556-1561
- Veit von Würzburg 1561-1577
- Johann Georg Zobel von Giebelstadt 1577-1580
- Martin von Eyb 1580-1583
- Ernst von Mengersdorf 1583-1591
- Neytard von Thüngen 1591-1598
- Johann Philipp von Gebsattel 1599-1609
- Johann Gottfried von Aschhausen 1609-1622 (Bishop of Würzburg 1617-1622)
- Johann Georg Fuchs von Dornheim 1623-1633
- Franz von Hatzfeld 1633-1642 (Bishop of Würzburg 1631-1642)
- Melchior Otto von Voit von Salzburg 1642-1653
- Philipp Valentin Albrecht Voit von Rieneck 1653-1672
- Peter Philipp von Dernbach 1672-1683
- Marquard Sebastian von Schenk von Stauffenberg 1683-1693
- Lothar Franz von Schönborn 1693-1729
- Friedrich Karl von Schönborn 1729-1746 (also Bishop of Würzburg)
- Johann Philipp Anton von Franckenstein 1746-1753
- Franz Konrad von Stadion und Thannhausen 1753-1757
- Adam Friedrich von Seinsheim 1757-1779 (also Bishop of Würzburg)
- Franz Ludwig von Erthal 1779-1795 (also Bishop of Würzburg)
- Christoph Franz von Buseck 1795-1805 (last Sovereign Prince-Bishop of Bamberg until 1802)
- Georg Karl Ignaz von Fechenbach zu Laudenbach 1805-1808 (also Bishop of Würzburg)

== Archbishops, 1818–present ==
Tenure	Incumbent	Notes
5 February 1818 to 29 January 1824	Joseph Graf von Stubenberg	Bishop of Eichstätt; confirmed 6 Apr 1818; died in office
10 March 1824 to 17 January 1842	Joseph Maria Johann Nepomuk Freiherr von Fraunberg	Bishop of Augsburg; confirmed 24 May 1824; died in office
24 February 1842 to 9 January 1858	Bonifaz Kaspar von Urban	Auxiliary Bishop of Munich and Freising, Munich; confirmed 25 May 1842; installed 24 July 1842; died in office
17 June 1858 to 4 January 1875	Michael von Deinlein	Bishop of Augsburg; confirmed 17 September 1858; installed 10 November 1858; died in office
31 May 1875 to 23 May 1890	Friedrich von Schreiber	Priest of Augsburg; confirmed 5 July 1875; ordained 5 September 1875; died in office
26 August 1890 to 25 January 1905	Joseph von Schork	Priest of Würzburg; confirmed 6 May 1891; ordained 24 May 1891; died in office
30 January 1905 to 23 April 1912	Friedrich Philipp von Abert	Priest of Würzburg; confirmed 27 March 1905; ordained 1 May 1905; died in office
4 May 1912 to 23 January 1943	Jacobus von Hauck	Priest of Würzburg; confirmed 18 June 1912; died in office
24 January 1943 to 29 March 1955	Joseph Otto Kolb	Auxiliary Bishop of Bamberg; installed 9 May 1943; died in office
16 May 1955 to 30 July 1976	Josef Schneider	Priest of Bamberg; ordained 13 July 1955; resigned
27 May 1977 to 31 March 1994	Elmar Maria Kredel	Priest of Bamberg; ordained 2 July 1977; resigned
25 March 1995 to 2 July 2001	Karl Heinrich Braun	Bishop of Eichstätt; installed 25 May 1995; resigned
28 June 2002 to 1 November 2022	Ludwig Schick	Auxiliary Bishop of Fulda
9 December 2023 to present	Herwig Gössl	Auxiliary Bishop of Bamberg
