= Gaillenreuth Castle =

Castle in Germany

- Ebermannstadt-Burggaillenreuth
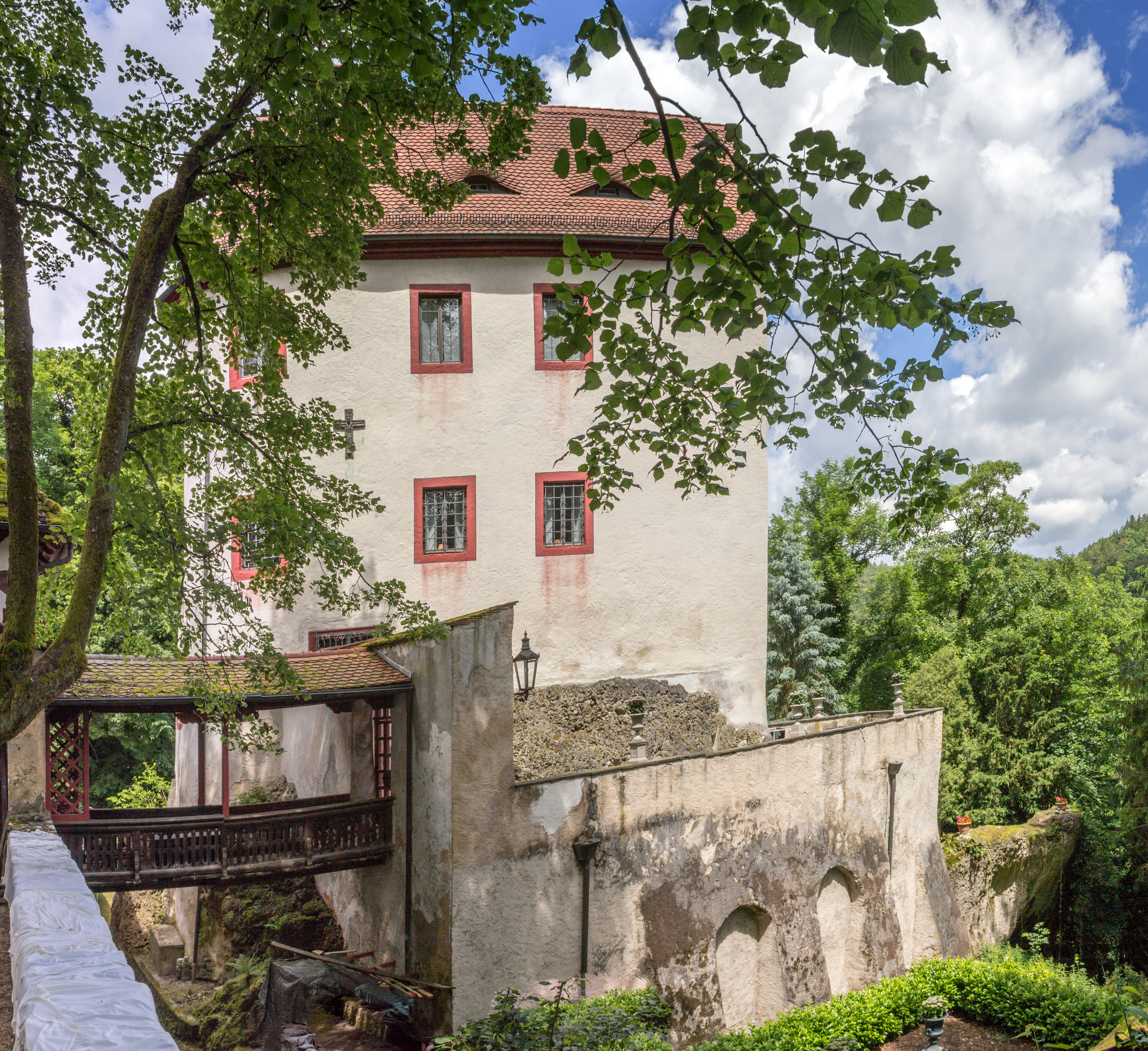
- Tower house and remains of the gateway

Site information
- Type: hill castle
- Code: DE-BY
- Condition: tower house, wall remains

Location
- Coordinates: 49°46′48″N 11°17′19″E
- Height: Height missing, see template documentation

Site history
- Built: first recorded 1122

Garrison information
- Occupants: clerics, nobility

Gaillenreuth Castle (German: Burg Gaillenreuth) is situated high above the Wiesent river on its upper western perimeter in the village of Burggaillenreuth. The village belongs to the borough of Ebermannstadt in the county of Forchheim in the south German state of Bavaria. All that survives is the southern part of the hill castle. As well as parts of the outer ward there is a tower house from the post-1632 period.

== History ==
The castle is one of six that the Bishop of Bamberg, Otto I of Mistelbach (1102–1139), procured for the Bishopric of Bamberg in 1122. Nothing is known of its previous occupants or who built it.

The next record of the castle comes from an appendix to the law book of the Bamberg bishop, Frederick of Hohenlohe (1342–1352). This notes that the Bishop of Bamberg, Leopold III of Bebenburg (1353–1363), paid 100 pounds of hellers to Conrad of Egloffstein for the maintenance of the castle.

Between 1353 and 1359 the castle appears to have been an episcopal fief fully occupied by the lords of Egloffstein, whereby in the course of time, part of the castle became their freehold property. In 1522, Conrad XI of Egloffstein transferred the allodial part of the castle to Bamberg bishop, Georg III of Limpurg (1505–1522), as a fief.

In 1525 the castle was razed during the Peasants' War, but was rebuilt by Conz of Egloffstein. On 8 July 1632, during the Thirty Years' War it was destroyed by Croatian troops. Exactly when it was rebuilt is not known. However, it is possible that only the southern part was rebuilt. In 1638 the lords of Egloffstein relinquished the castle from the episcopal fiefdom through an exchange. The Burggaillenreuther line of the lords of Egloffstein died out in 1682 with John (Hans) Philip II of Egloffstein.

In 1684 the lords of Egloffstein sold their allodial part of the castle to Freiherr Karl Friedrich Voit von Rieneck. In 1810 Anton Joseph Freiherr von Horneck purchased the castle. In 1847 it was described as derelict. A renovation of the surviving buildings was carried out at that time by August Horneck von Weinheim. The castles is now in private ownership.

The castle has nothing to do with the robber baron, Eppelein von Gailingen, who was hanged in 1381.

== Literature ==
- Hellmut Kunstmann: Die Burgen der südwestlichen Fränkischen Schweiz 2. Auflage, Kommissionsverlag Degener & Co, Neustadt an der Aisch, 1990, pp. 16-33.
- Gustav Voit, Walter Rüfer: Eine Burgenreise durch die Fränkische Schweiz – Auf den Spuren des Zeichners A. F. Thomas Ostertag, 2nd edn., Verlag Palm & Enke, Erlangen, 1991, ISBN 3-7896-0064-4, pp. 55-58.
- Toni Eckert, Susanne Fischer, Renate Freitag, Rainer Hofmann, Walter Tausendpfund: Die Burgen der Fränkischen Schweiz – Ein Kulturführer. Gürtler Druck, Forchheim o.J., ISBN 3-9803276-5-5, pp. 35-39.
