= Bamberg Cathedral =

Church in Bavaria, Germany

- The Cathedral Church of St Peter and St George
- Bamberger Dom
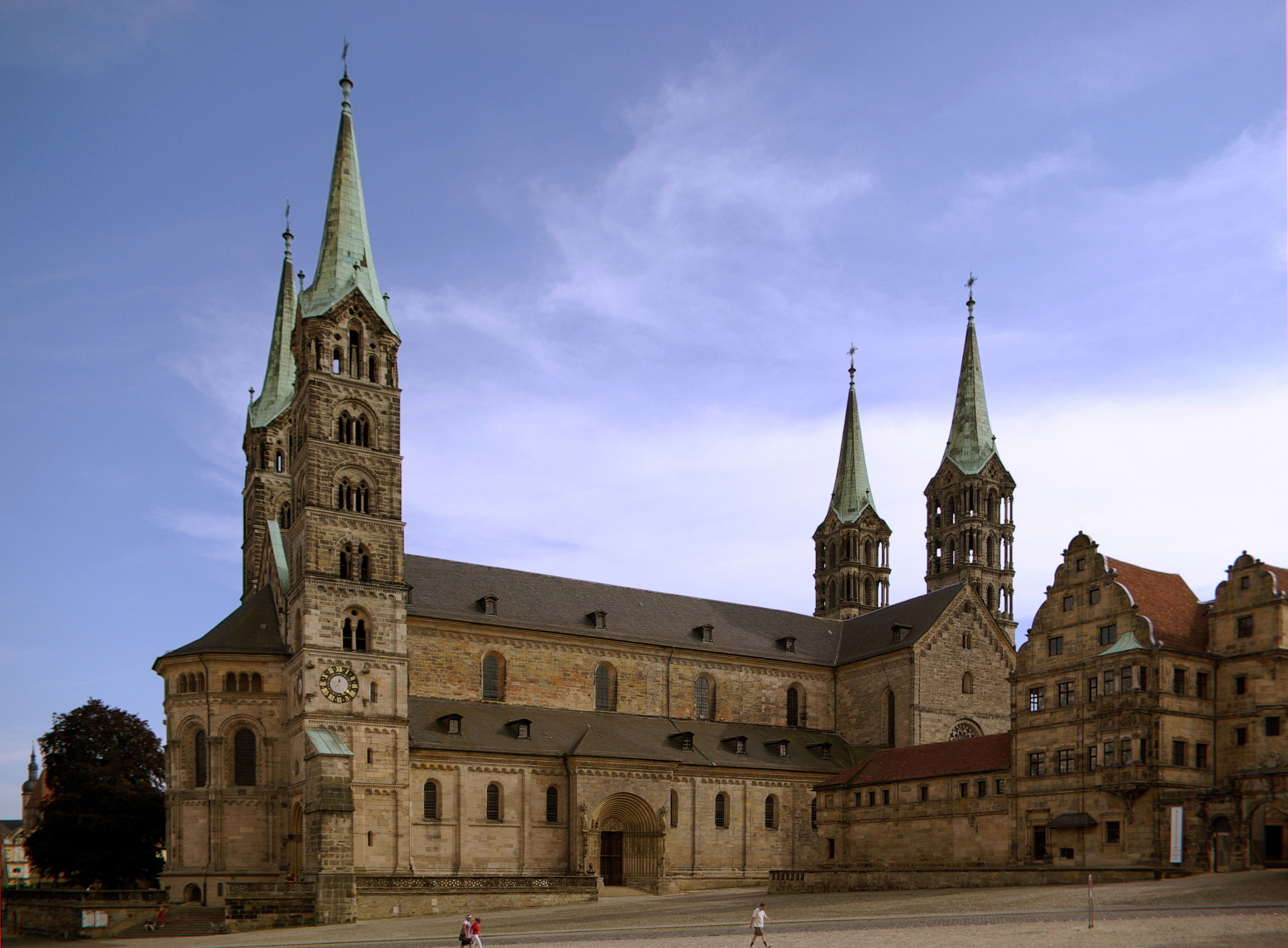
- Bamberg Cathedral
- Bamberg Cathedral
- 49°53′27″N 10°52′57″E
- Location: Bamberg
- Country: Germany
- Denomination: Catholic
- Website: Website of the cathedral

History
- Status: Active
- Founded: 1002
- Founder: Heinrich II (Henry II)
- Consecrated: 6 May 1012

Architecture
- Functional status: Metropolitan Cathedral, Minor Basilica
- Style: Romanesque
- Completed: 1012

Specifications
- Length: 94 m (308 ft)
- Width: 28 m (92 ft)
- Height: 26 m (85 ft)

Administration
- Archdiocese: Archdiocese of Bamberg

Clergy
- Archbishop: Herwig Gössl

UNESCO World Heritage Site
- Type: Cultural
- Criteria: ii, iv
- Designated: 1993 (17th session)
- Reference no.: 624
- Region: Europe and North America

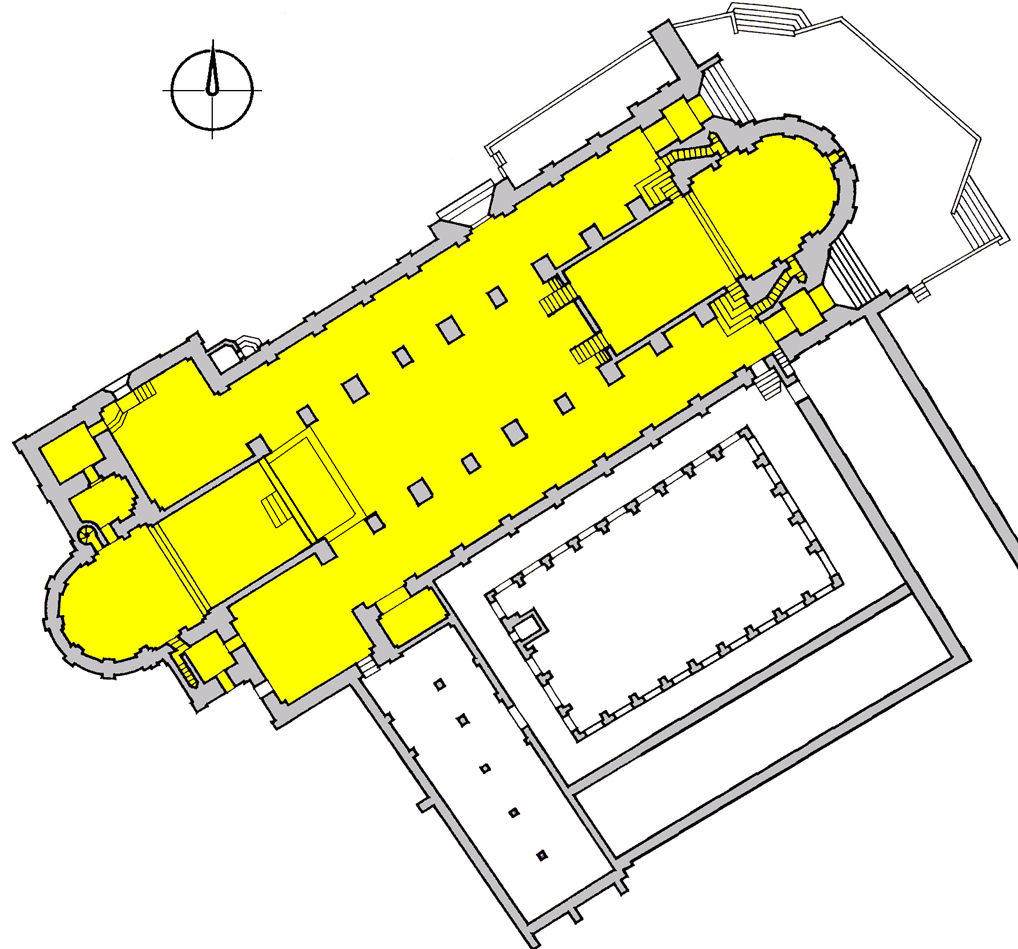
Plan showing the two choirs, one at each end of the nave

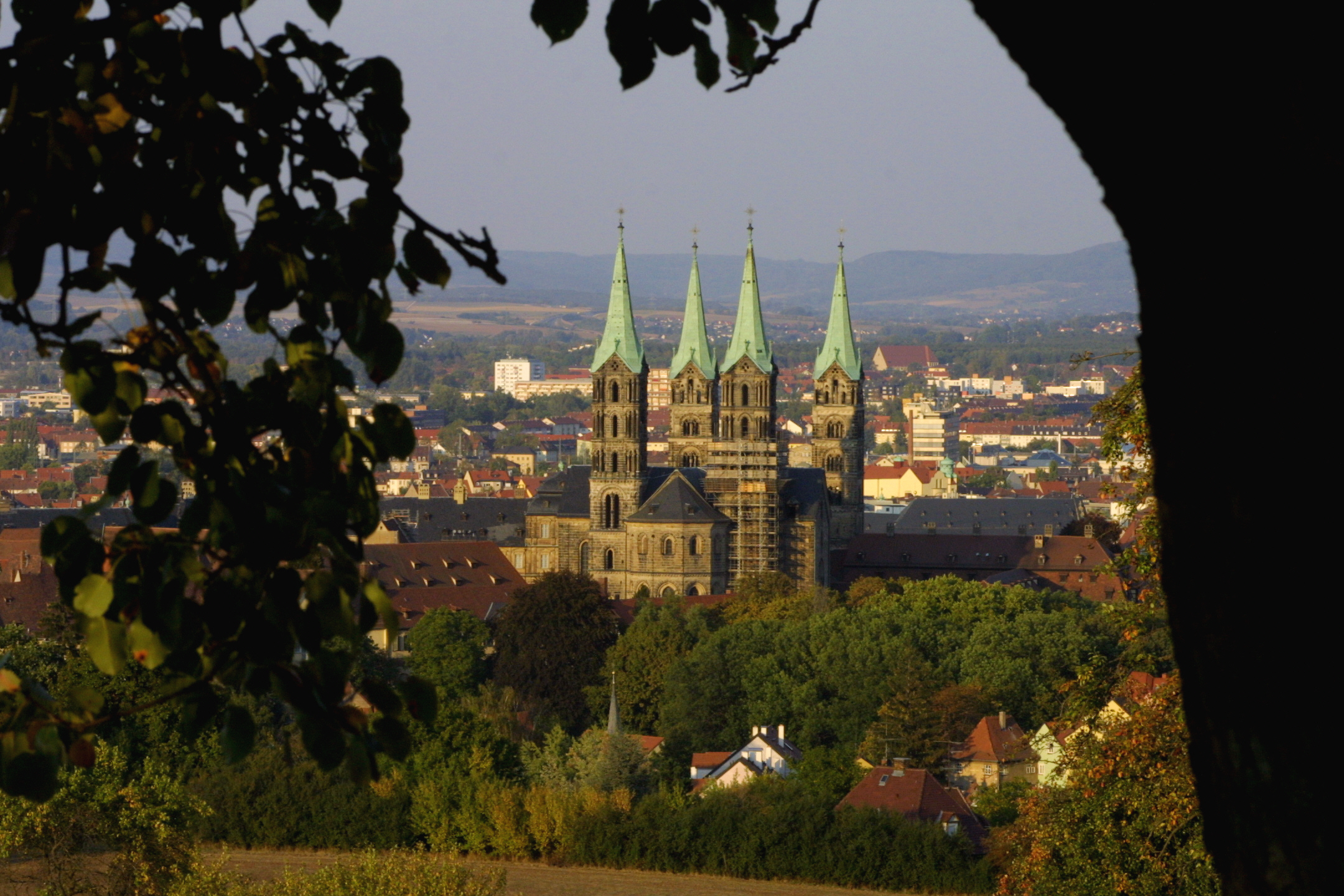
Bamberg Cathedral from the west

Bamberg Cathedral (German: Bamberger Dom, official name Bamberger Dom St. Peter und St. Georg) is a church in Bamberg, Germany, completed in the 13th century. The cathedral is under the administration of the Archdiocese of Bamberg and is the seat of its archbishop. Since 1993, the cathedral has been part of the UNESCO World Heritage Site "Town of Bamberg".

It was founded in 1002 by King (and later Emperor) Heinrich II (Henry II) and consecrated in 1012. With the tombs of Henry II and his wife Cunigunde, the cathedral contains the remains of the only imperial couple that was canonized. With the tomb of Pope Clement II (1005–1047) it also contains the only papal grave in Germany, and north of the Alps.

After the first two cathedrals burned down in the 11th and 12th centuries, the current structure, a late Romanesque building with four large towers, was built in the 13th century.

The cathedral is about 94 m long, 28 m broad, 26 m high, and the four towers are each about 81 m high. It contains many works of art, including the marble tomb of the founder and his wife, the Empress Kunigunde, considered a masterpiece of the sculptor Tilman Riemenschneider, and carved between 1499 and 1513.

Another well-known treasure of the cathedral is an equestrian statue known as the Bamberg Horseman (German: Der Bamberger Reiter). This statue, possibly depicting the Hungarian king Stephen I, most likely dates to the period from 1225 to 1237 and is the first of its kind since antiquity.

== History ==
=== Background ===
Heinrich (Henry), son of Heinrich der Zänker became Duke of Bavaria in 995, replacing his banished father. His favourite dwelling was at Bamberg and he gave that property (probably in spring 1000) to his wife Kunigunde as a wedding gift. In 1002, Heinrich was elected King of Germany and he started to conduct his government business from Bamberg, giving the town various privileges (mint, tolls, market rights). Probably late in 1002 the decision was made to establish a diocese at Bamberg. Henry was pious, he and his wife had no children to leave the property to and the eastern border of his kingdom still lacked a diocese. Against the opposition of the Bishop of Eichstätt, who lost the northern rim of his territory, and of the Bishop of Würzburg, who lost all of the eastern part of his, the Reichssynode of All Saints' Day 1007 at Frankfurt established the Diocese of Bamberg. The Hochstift was endowed with royal territories, notably around Bamberg and near Villach. Kunigunde contributed Bamberg itself. The first bishop (1007–40) was Eberhard von Abenberg, Heinrich's former chancellor. He took his home in the former Königspfalz. In 1007/1020 the diocese came under the direct authority of the pope, and was thus henceforth outside of the control of the Archbishop of Mainz. King Heinrich (he was crowned Holy Roman Emperor only in 1014) became a canon of the cathedral chapter.

=== Construction history ===
Construction of this first cathedral had begun in 1002, with work starting on two crypts. It was consecrated on Heinrich's birthday, on 6 May 1012. This first cathedral was a cruciform basilica with the main choir in the west and a second to the east, each above a crypt. Two towers were located on the eastern façade. The nave was covered by a flat wooden ceiling. This cathedral was smaller than the current structure (only around 75 m long). This cathedral burned down in the Easter week of 1081. Whilst the interior art was completely destroyed, damage to the structure was relatively minor. It was quickly rebuilt – by 1087 it was possible to hold a synode here. Bishop Otto had the church rebuilt completely and it was reconsecrated in 1111.

This rebuilt church also burned down in 1185.

In 1047, the body of Pope Clement II (Bishop of Bamberg, 1040–6) was transferred from Rome to Bamberg and was buried in the cathedral. With the destruction of the tomb of Pope Benedict V at Hamburg at the beginning of the 19th century, this became the only papal grave in Germany. All other popes are buried in France or Italy.

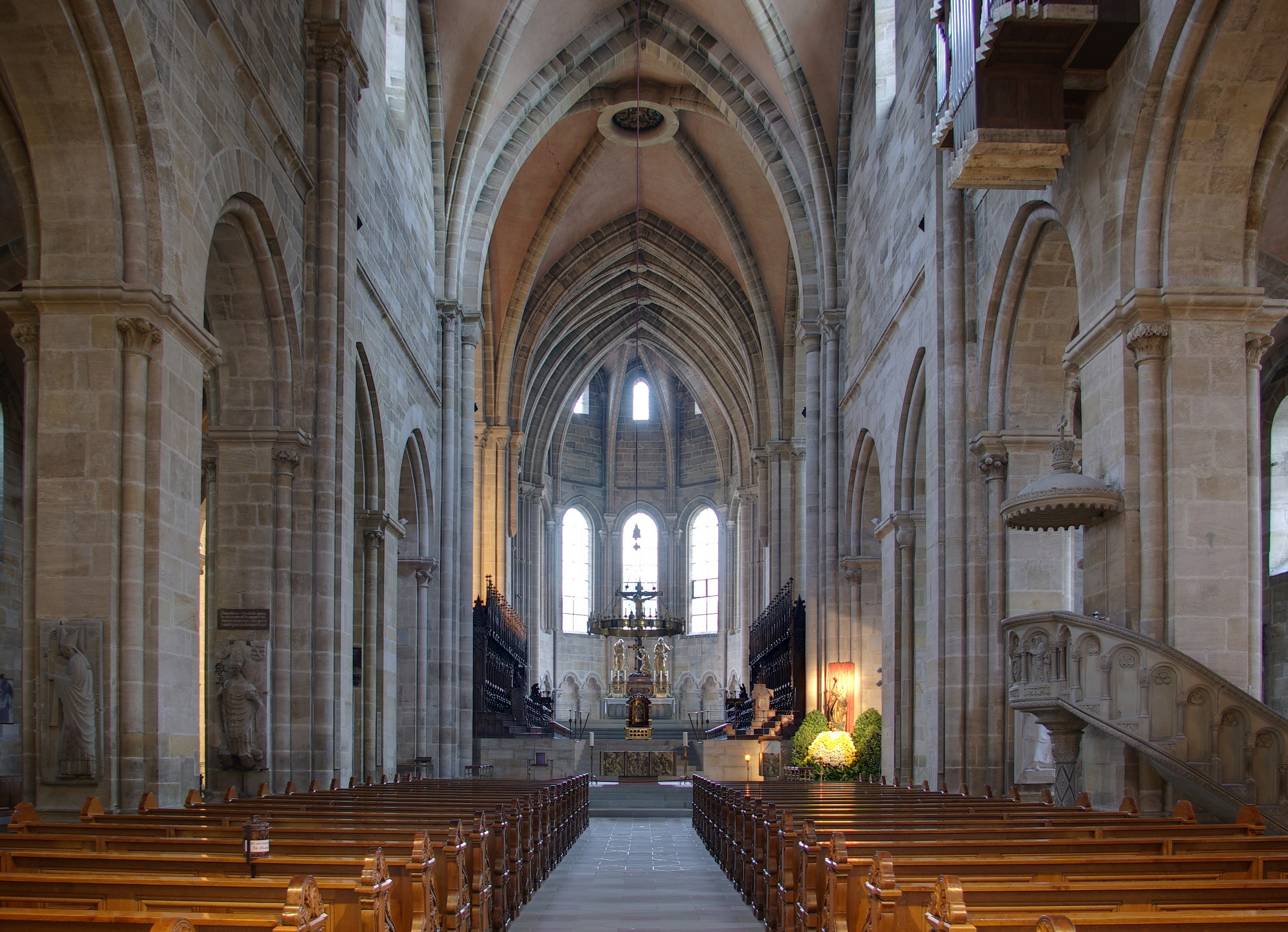
The nave of Bamberg Cathedral

The current late Romanesque cathedral was erected (with short intermissions) by three men of the house of Andechs-Merania: Otto (bishop from 1177 to 1196), Ekbert of Bamberg (bishop 1203–37) and Poppo (1237–42).

The wealth of the cathedral chapter and the generosity of the House of Andechs-Merania resulted in a large, "splendid" building (see description below). It was consecrated on 6 May 1237.

=== Later history ===
Heinrich had been canonized in 1146, as was Kunigunde in 1200. In 1499–1513, Tilman Riemenschneider created the tomb of the founders (see below). Many other works of art were added during the Gothic period.

During the 17th century, the interior of the cathedral was changed to Baroque style in two waves. The first came under Bishop Johann Gottfried von Aschhausen. The medieval coloured windows were removed. After 1626 the interior was whitened, painting over frescoes. A second wave followed after the end of the Thirty Years' War in 1648–53 under Bishop Melchior Otto Voit von Salzburg. The tomb of Heinrich and Kunigunde was moved, the rood screens were demolished and new high altars set up in both choirs.

In 1729–33, Balthasar Neumann, architect of the UNESCO World Heritage Site Würzburg Residence added the chapter house with administration offices for the cathedral chapter.

In 1802/3, the Bishopric of Bamberg was secularized and became a part of the Electorate of Bavaria. In 1817, Bamberg became an archdiocese. The province includes the dioceses of Speyer, Würzburg and Eichstätt.

The Baroque alterations were removed in a "purification" in 1828–37 ordered in 1826 by Ludwig I of Bavaria, who saw the cathedral as a national monument. Altars and other sculptures were auctioned off in an attempt to return the church to its original, medieval state. Baroque art was replaced with Romanesque Revival art.

During a renovation of 1969–74, the church was changed in accordance with the Second Vatican Council, e.g. by moving the main altar from the eastern choir to a location in front of the western choir.

== Description ==
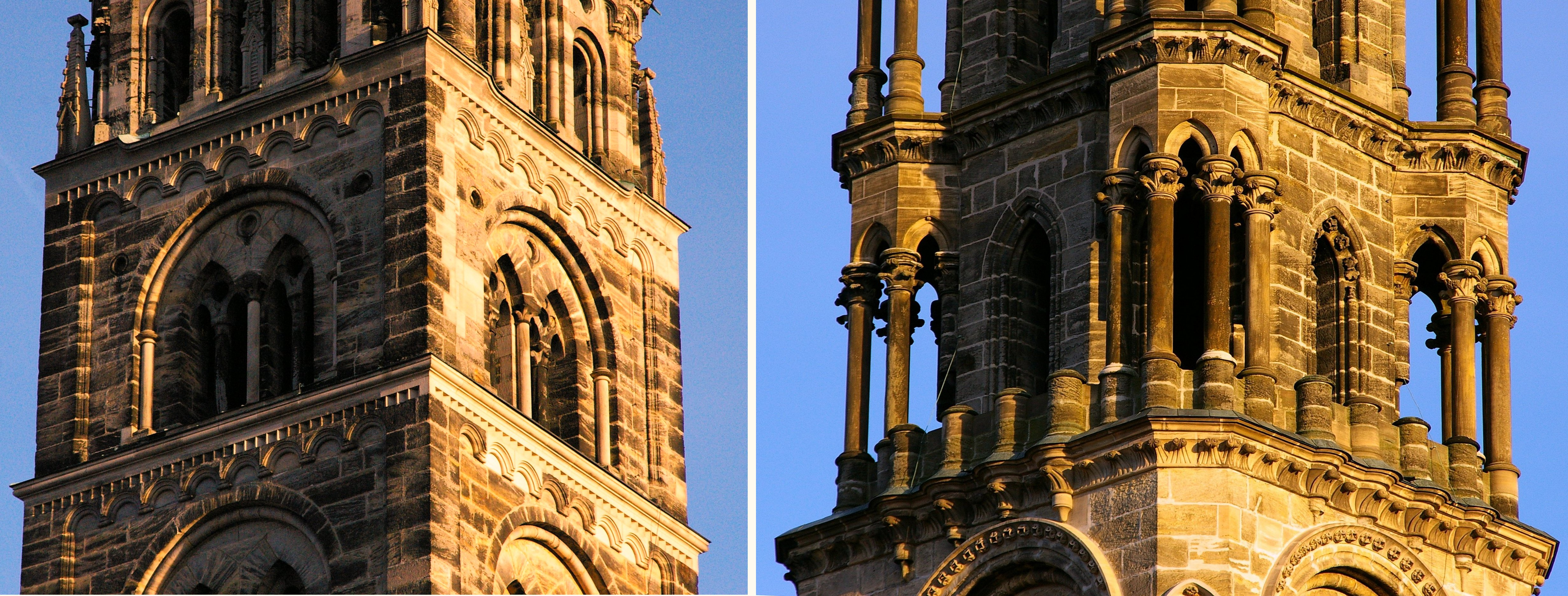
These two towers show the difference between the two styles of architecture very clearly: the Romanesque on the left and the Gothic on the right.

=== Overview and exterior ===
The cathedral is about 94 m (308 ft) long, 28 m (92 ft) broad, 26 m (85 ft) high, and the four towers are each about 81 m (266 ft) high.

Due to its long construction process, several styles were used in different parts of the cathedral, particularly the Romanesque and Gothic ones. Between these two styles is the Transitional style, and this is the style which is characteristic of the nave.

The current structure is a late Romanesque building with four big towers. The eastern towers were originally lower, but raised to the western towers' height after 1766 by steep pointed gables, added by architect Johann Jacob Michael Küchel. The western towers are early Gothic.

=== Choirs ===
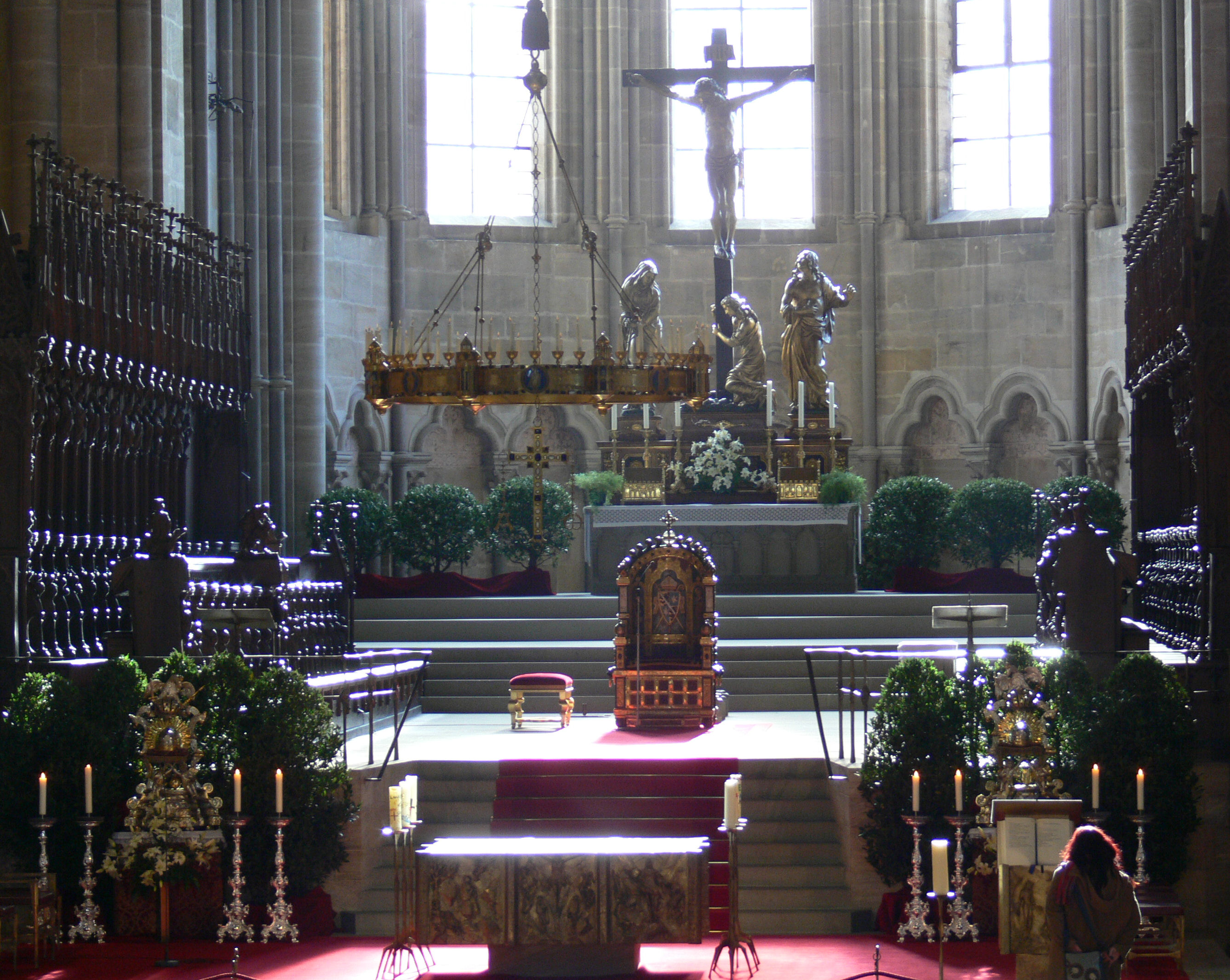
Western choir with Volksaltar, chandelier, choir stalls and cathedra. Kreuzaltar in the back

The cathedral has a choir at each end. The eastern choir is the oldest part of the cathedral, still in pure Romanesque style. The western choir is early Gothic and its vault was built from 1232.

The east chancel, elevated due to the presence of a crypt beneath, is dedicated to St. George. This symbolizes the Holy Roman Empire. Of the figures adorning the southern choir screen, the first three apostles pairs are attributed to the stonemasons who made the Gnadenpforte (see below). The others and the twelve prophets on the northern screen reflect a later style. The choir stalls with carved chimeras and lions date from the 14th century. The fresco in the apse is much younger. It was created in 1927/8.

The west chancel is dedicated to St. Peter symbolizing the Pope. It contains the cathedra (created in 1904) and behind it, the grave of Pope Clement II. To the left and right are Gothic (late 14th century) choir stalls, richly carved. In the back, the Kreuzaltar dominates the choir. The figures of Jesus, Mary, Mary Magdalena and John was created from gold-covered basswood in 1652/3 by Justus Glesker, auctioned off during the purification in 1835, bought back in 1915 and erected in 1917. In the front is the 20th-century Volksaltar with a large wheel chandelier above. This sandstone base, fitted with various bronze plates showing scenes from the life of Jesus, was made in 1974/5 by Klaus Backmund.

=== Transepts ===
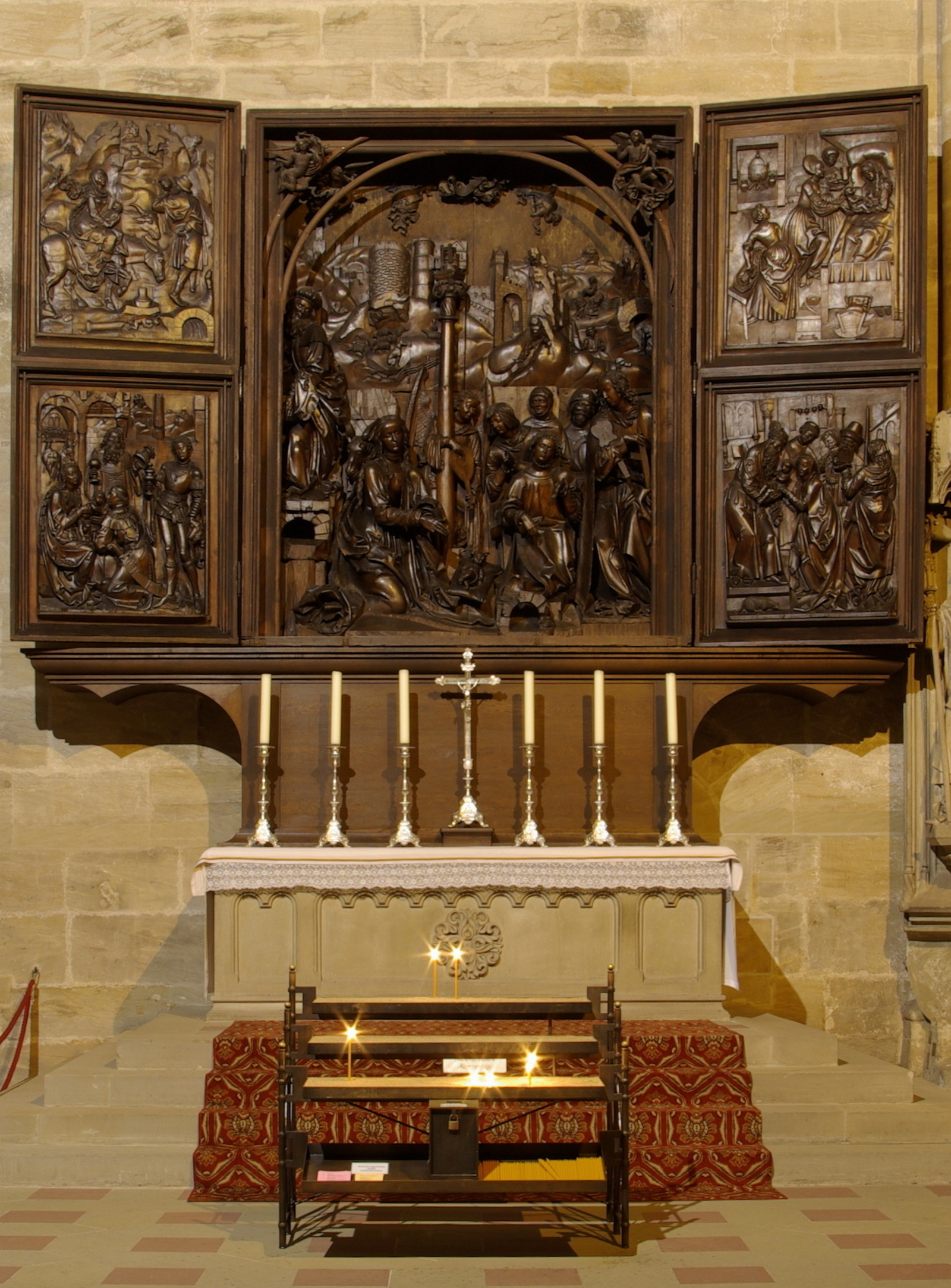
Veit Stoss Altar

The northern transept holds a late Gothic (c. 1500) altar dedicated to Mary (Mühlhausener Altar). It was previously located in the Protestant parish church of Mühlhausen. In 1781, it was replaced and then sold off in 1891. Given to Archbishop Joseph von Schork, he gifted it in 1904 to the cathedral.

The southern transept contains a large Nativity altar made of basswood by the artist Veit Stoss in 1520–3. It was originally intended for a church in Nuremberg (Karmeliterkloster) but after Reformation came to that city in 1524 the council refused to allow it to be set up. Veit's son Andreas Stoss, who had moved to Bamberg in 1526, managed to have it brought to Bamberg in 1543, where it was erected in the church Obere Pfarre. It only came to the cathedral in 1937 and is on a permanent loan from the parish. The altar is incomplete (e.g. the predella was never made) and only some parts of it were made by Stoss himself rather than by his workshop.

=== Nave and side-aisles ===
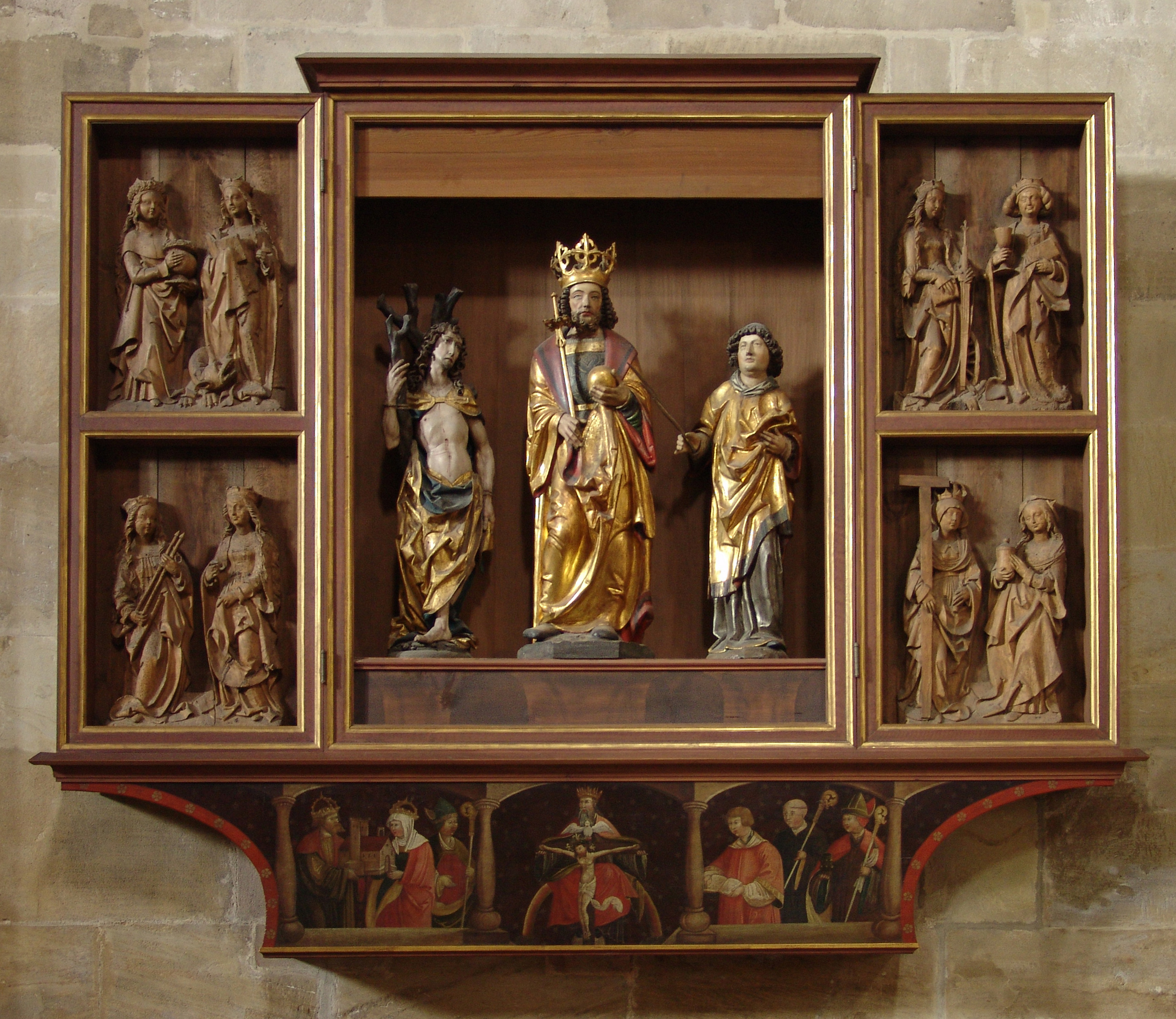
So-called Riemenschneideraltar

The nave, which connects the eastern and western choir and accounts for about a third of the overall length of the church, contains the imperial tomb, the Bamberger Reiter, an early 19th-century pulpit and the organ.

Two more notable altars are located in the side aisles: The Kirchgattendorfer Altar and the so-called Riemenschneider Altar. The former is dedicated to Mary and dates from the 16th century. It came from the Protestant parish church of Kirchgattendorf in Upper Franconia and was set up here in 1921. The latter was assembled in 1926 from various individual figures of different origin, all dating from around 1500. It is named after the statue of St. Sebastian, which is attributed to the workshop of Riemenschneider.

=== Crypts ===
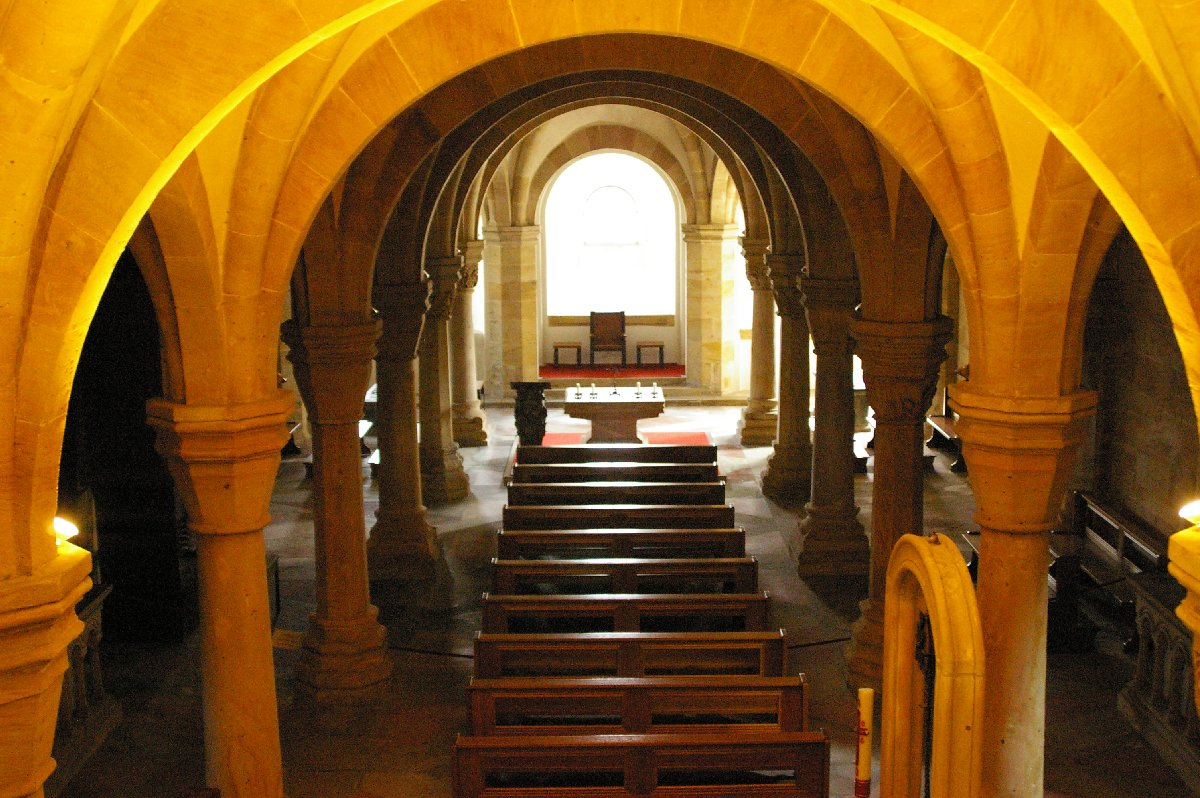
Eastern crypt

The western crypt was filled in with rubble but reopened in 1987–95. It was discovered that it still contained features of Heinrich's original cathedral. It now serves as the burial site for the Archbishops of Bamberg. The first to be buried there in 1998 was Josef Schneider (1955–76). Under the northwestern tower a chapel (Häupterkapelle) was created in 1997 to keep the skulls of the two founders, Heinrich and Kunigunde. They are contained within a glass shrine on a stele. Kunigunde's skull was previously kept in a cabinet in the eastern choir, behind the so-called Sonnenloch which gave access to the outside of the cathedral.

The eastern crypt was created alongside the current cathedral, c. 1200. The tombs now here were only relocated from the nave in the 19th and 20th centuries. These include bishops from the 11th and 12th centuries and the tomb of King Konrad III (Conrad III) who died at Bamberg in 1152 and was initially buried next to Heinrich and Kunigunde. There is also a well used for baptisms.

=== Chapels ===
==== Nagelkapelle ====
This is the former chapter hall beneath which members of the cathedral chapter were also buried (the bronze slabs from their burials have now been moved to the walls). A wooden Gothic altar from c. 1500 is located in the further, late-Gothic part of the room. The name "Nagelkapelle" ("Nail chapel") refers to a nail said to come from the True Cross; this nail has been venerated at Bamberg since the 14th century.

==== Sakramentskapelle ====
Formerly the Antonius or Gertrude Chapel, this was rededicated in 1974 after the Second Vatican Council. It now serves to store the sacramental bread for the Eucharist. It contains a painting (Rosenkranzgemälde) attributed to Lucas Cranach the Elder (c. 1520).

=== Sculptures and carvings ===
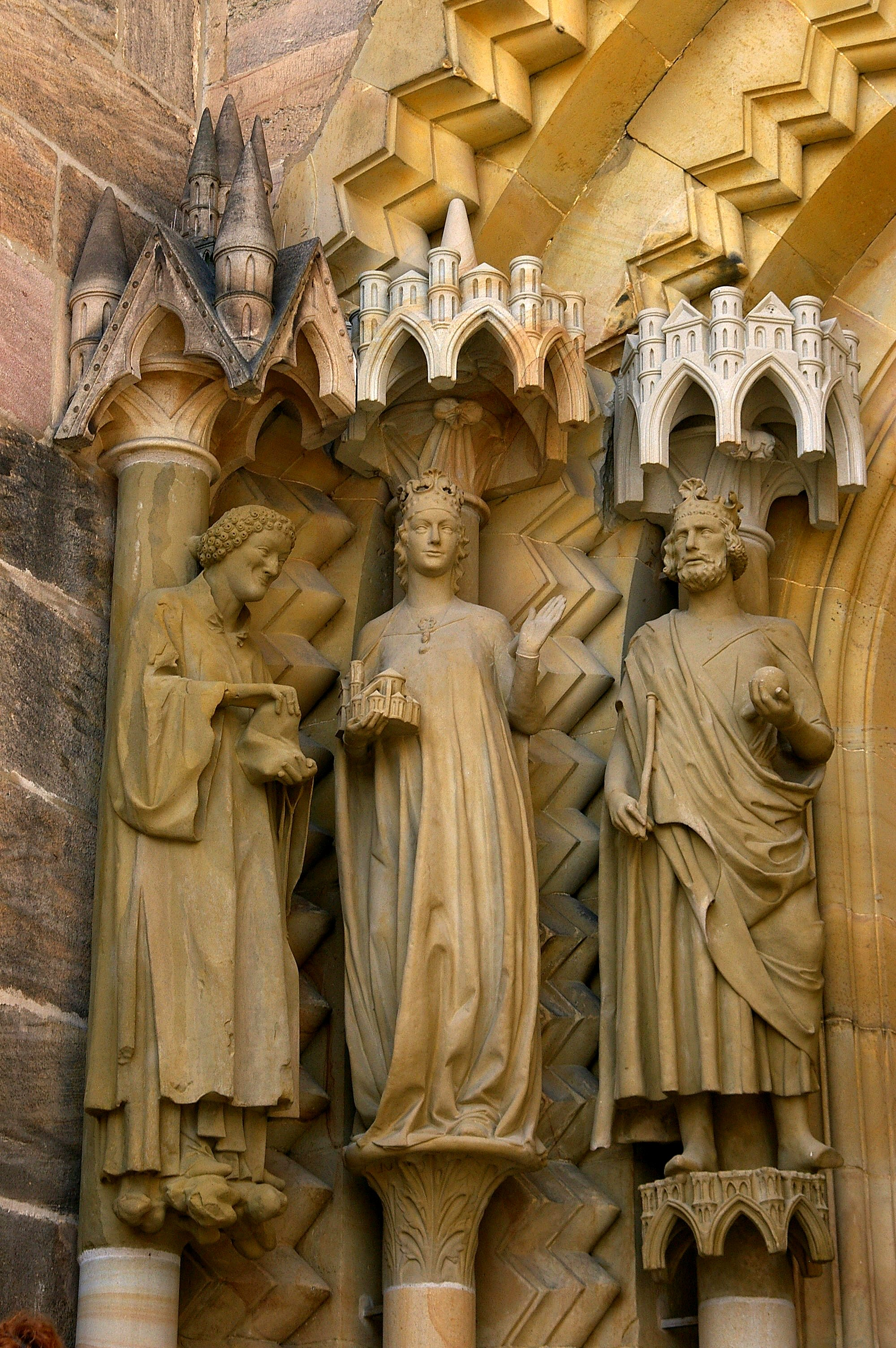
St. Stephen (left), Kunigunde (centre) and Heinrich II (right), carved in the entrance porch of the Adamspforte

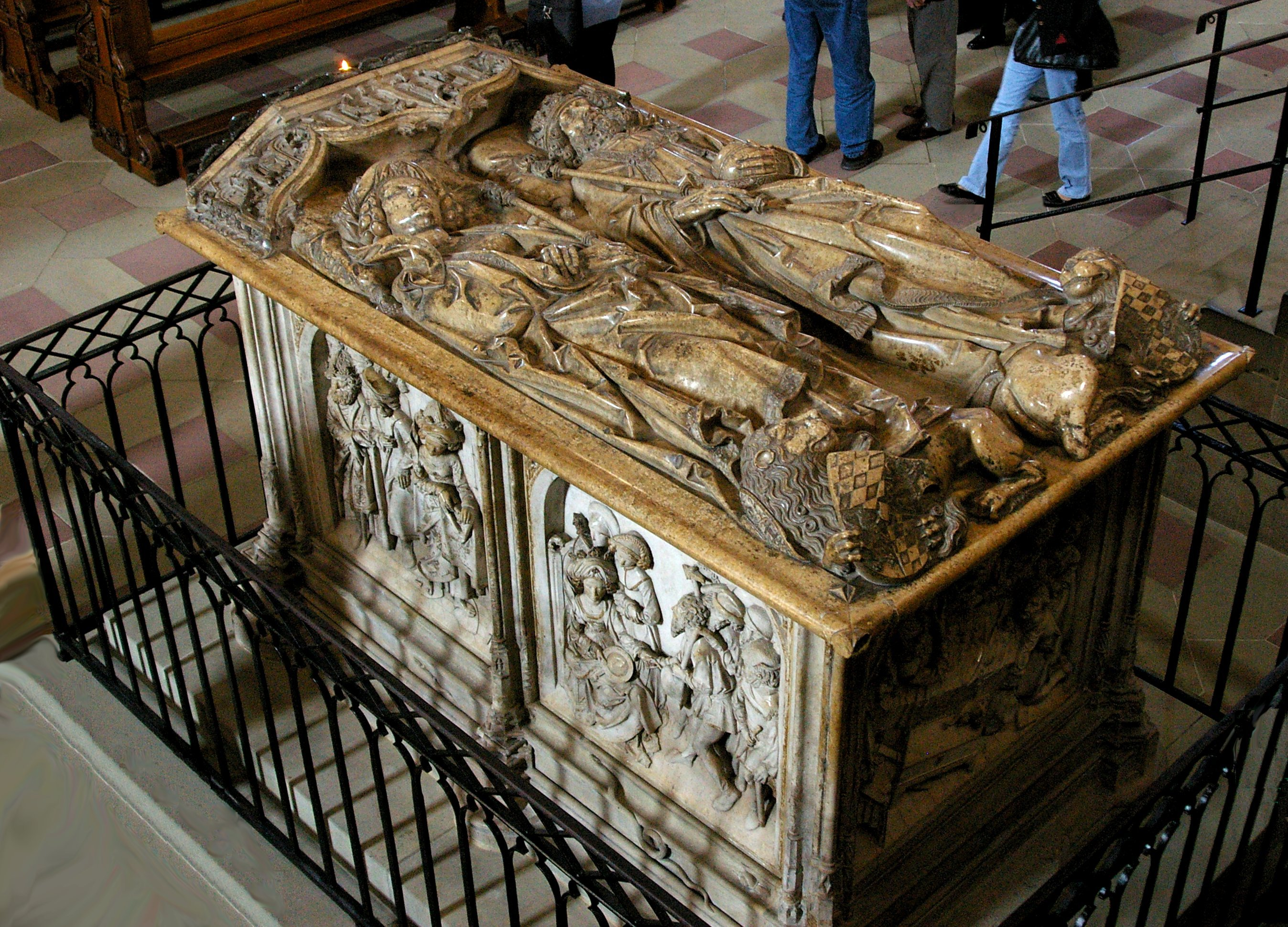
Tomb of Heinrich II and Kunigunde by Tilman Riemenschneider

There are many sculptures both inside the cathedral and adorning the exterior.

==== Tomb of Heinrich and Kunigunde ====
One of the most notable works of art of the cathedral is the tomb of Emperor Heinrich II, the founder of the cathedral, and his wife, Empress Kunigunde. It was made by sculptor Tilman Riemenschneider from polished Solnhofen limestone and marble from the Franconian Jura. It took him 14 years to carve: between 1499 and 1513. The tomb, located near the eastern choir, is slightly higher than floor level because below there is a crypt. The tomb rises about 1.7 m above the floor. The top is carved with the likeness of Emperor and Empress. Above is a late-Gothic canopy. The carvings round the sides, reflecting the influence of Renaissance art, tell of various episodes in the lives of the imperial couple: The Empress walks across red-hot ploughshares to prove her innocence after being accused of adultery, the payment of the workers who built St. Stephan, the Emperor being cured by Saint Benedict, the Emperor's death and the weighing of his soul by the archangel Michael. Reportedly they are based on sketches by Wolfgang Katzheimer.

==== Bamberger Reiter ====
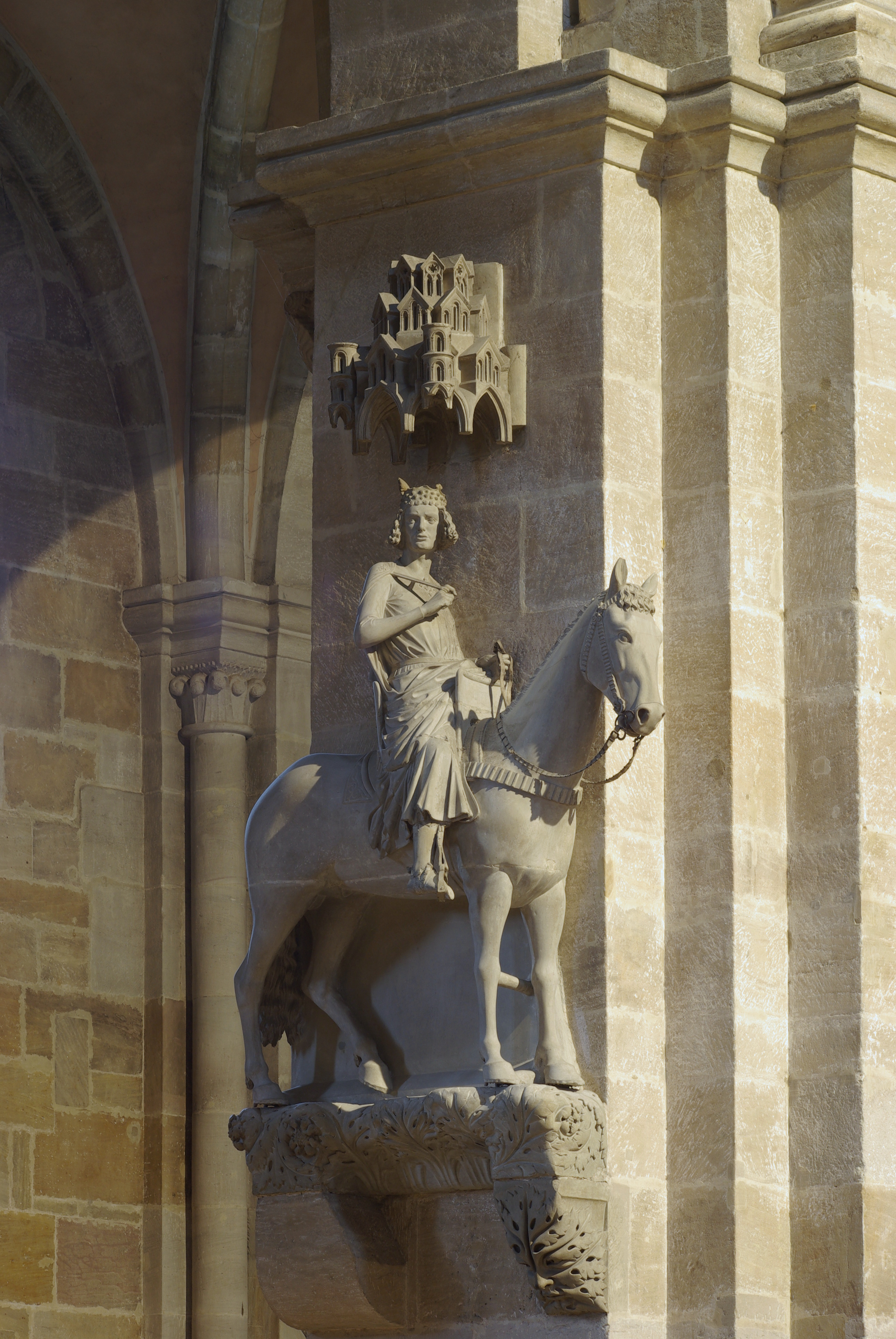
The Bamberger Reiter

Near the tomb, on the northwestern choir column, supported by an Acanthus corbel, stands an equestrian statue known as the Bamberg Horseman (Bamberger Reiter). There is no consensus on who this knight on horseback really was supposed to represent. During the cathedral's long history, the favoured version changed. The Romantics thought he was a German emperor from the Hohenstaufen family. The Nazis thought he was a knight who symbolized German perfection, looking towards the east for new lands to conquer. Pictures of the horseman were displayed in schools, hostels and dwellings.

It is now thought that he was probably the 11th century Hungarian king Stephen I. This is based on modern technology which has revealed the original colours used to paint the statue.

The sculptor carved only his mark into the sculpture, leaving his identity a mystery. He may also have been involved in the creation of figures on the eastern choir screen (Mary and Elisabeth) and possibly of the Last Judgment of the Fürstenportal. The Reiter is probably the oldest statue of a horseman created in post-Roman Germany.

==== Portals ====
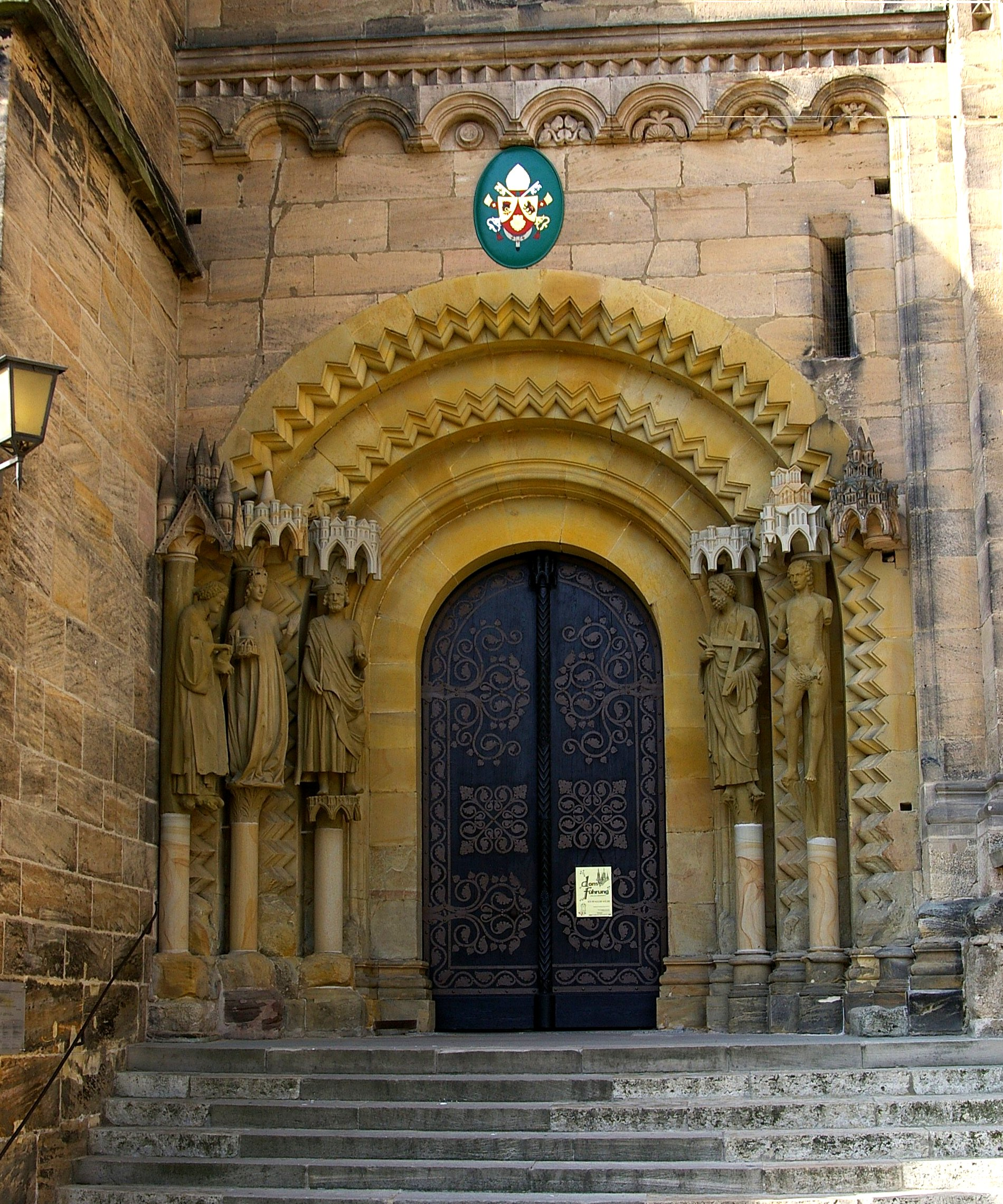
Adamspforte

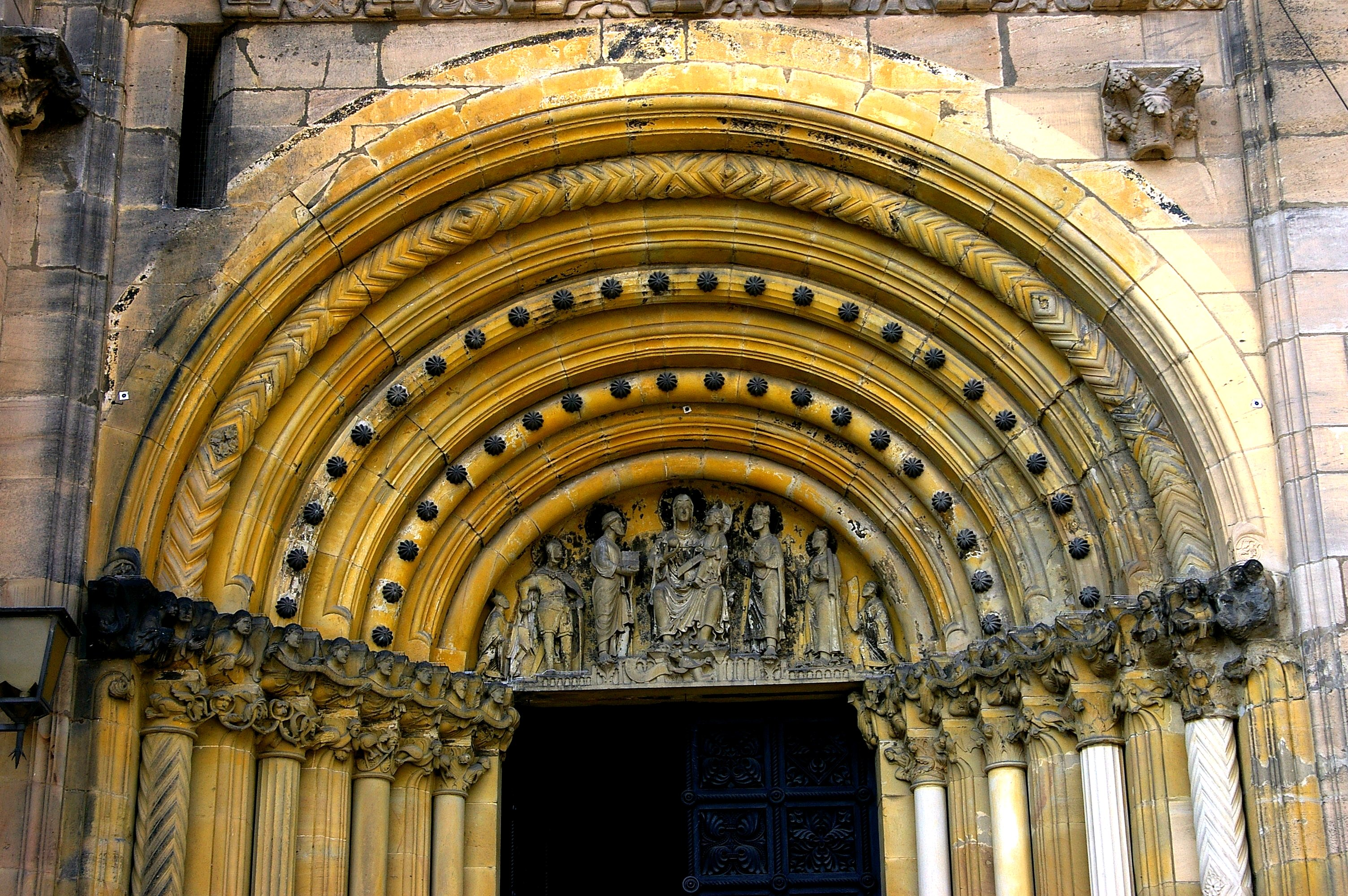
Tympanum of the Gnadenpforte

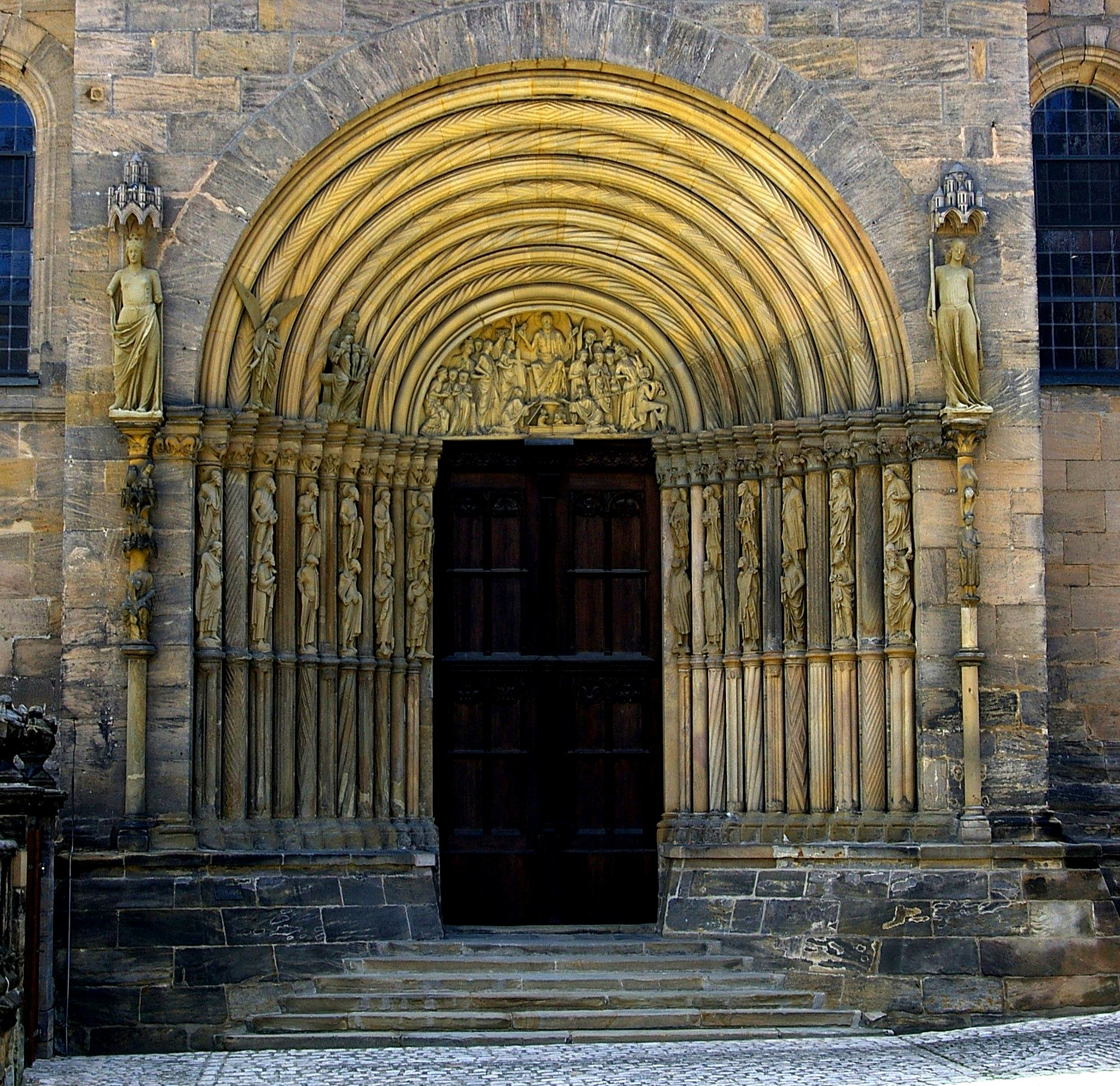
Fürstenportal

Numerous carvings ornament the three major portals. The Adamspforte and Marienpforte (or Gnadenpforte) leading into the eastern towers are each guarded by a carved Romanesque lion, a weathered remainder of Heinrich's original cathedral. The former portal sports figures (replicas) of St. Stephen, Kunigunde, Heinrich II, St. Peter and Adam and Eve. The latter is a funnel-shaped portal of the Lombardian style. The tympanum shows Mary, venerated by St. Peter and St. George on one side and by Kunigunde and Heinrich on the other. Figures cowering in the corners are interpreted to be bishop Ekbert (left), a cleric possibly cathedral provost Poppo of Andechs-Merania (right) and a crusader in the centre, maybe based on one "frater Wortwinus", architect of the 1229–31 work.

The main portal, not in the west as usual due to the two-choir structure of the cathedral but in the centre of the north wall, is called Fürstenportal (princes' portal) and opened only on holy days. It accesses the northern side aisle and was started by late Romanesque artisans (prophets and apostles) but finished by early Gothic workers (Last Judgment in the tympanum). The statues (replicas) topping the columns are Ecclesia and Synagoga (the originals were moved in 1937). There are also statues here of Abraham and the Angel announcing the Last Judgement.

The Veitspforte is a minor entryway, dating to the early Gothic period. It was inspired by the style the Cistercians had brought from France to southern Germany, as at Ebrach Abbey. The portal gives access to the southern transept.

==== Papal grave ====
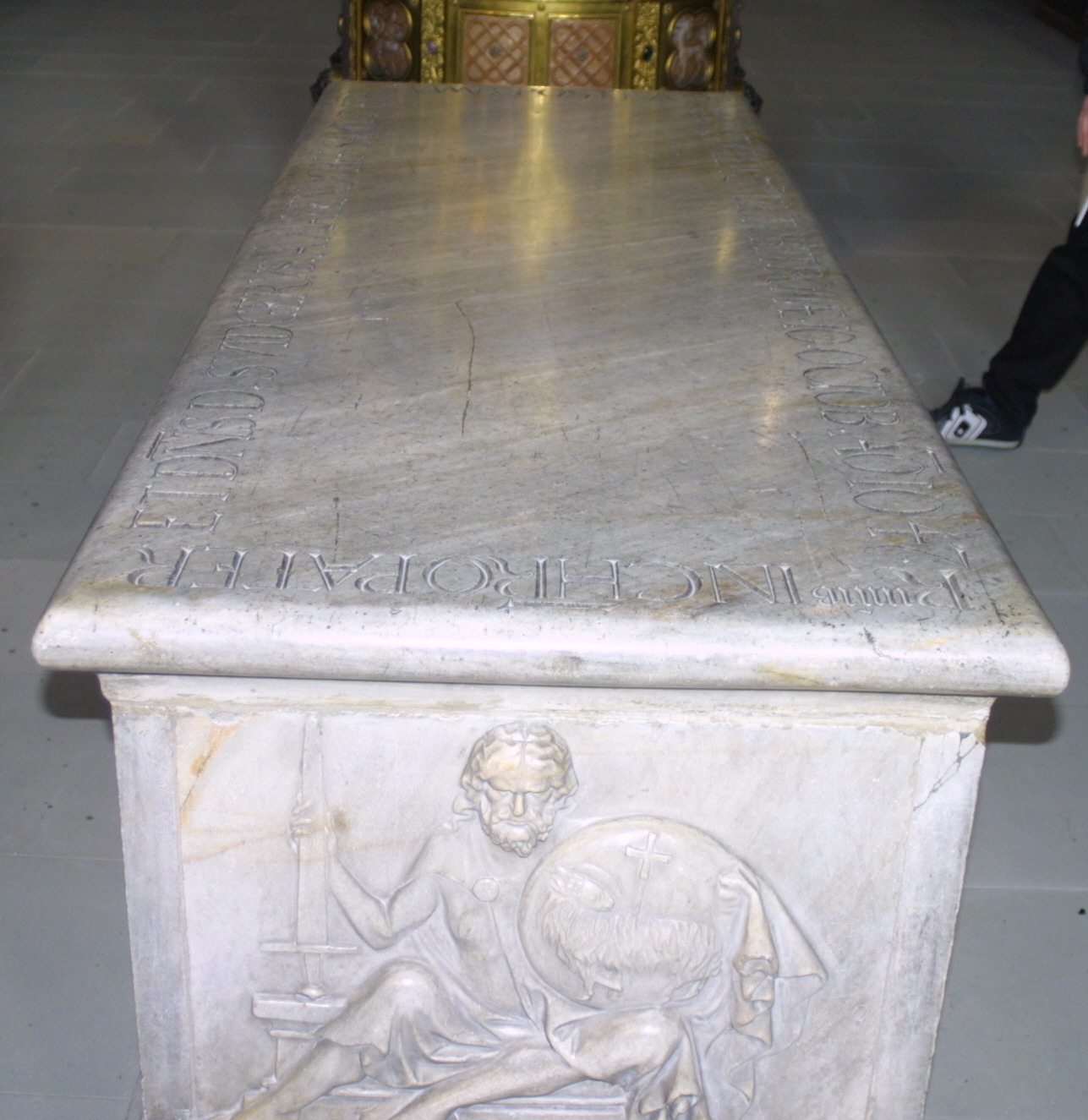
The grave of Pope Clement II

The tomb of Pope Clement II (1005–47) is made from silver-grey marble with carved reliefs from the first half of the 13th century on all four sides: the four Cardinal virtues, death of the pope and St. Michael, rivers of Paradise, and John the Baptist (or possibly Christ sitting in judgment over the world).

==== Others ====
Although many medieval bishops' tombs remain inside the cathedral, most of the later ones where transferred to the Michaelskirche during the 19th-century "purification" of the cathedral.

=== Organ ===
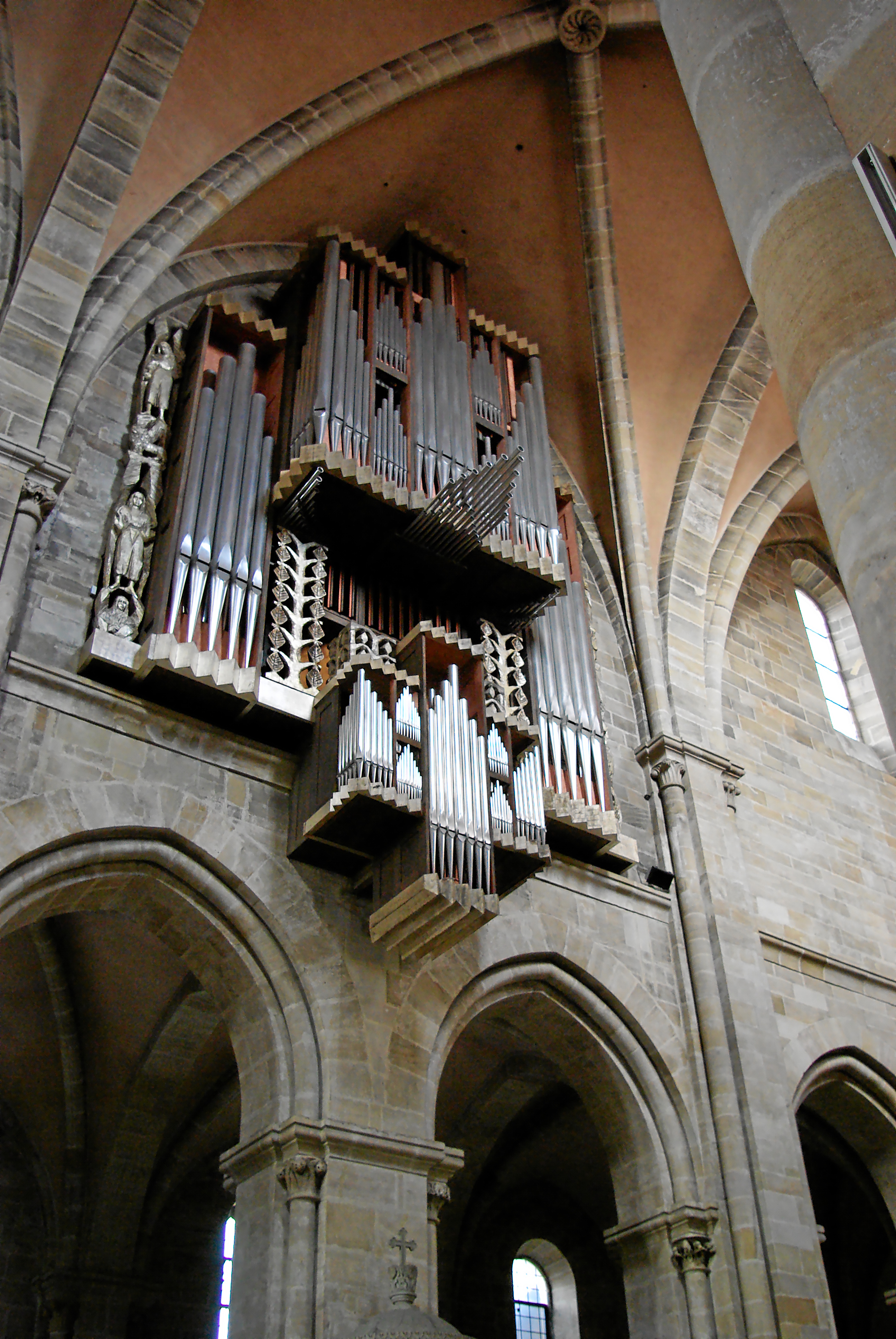
The organ of Bamberg Cathedral

The cathedral first had an organ in 1415. The one that was built in 1868 gave many problems and had to be rebuilt five years later, but it was kept until 1940 because of its good sound.

The organ that is present in the cathedral today was built in 1976 by the organ builder Rieger. There are four angel figures in the corners of the organ case. The organ has four manuals and pedalboard. All the organs during the cathedral's history were built against the north wall because the sound was best there.

Every year about 40 concerts are given in the cathedral.

=== Bells ===
No.	Name	Year	Caster, City	Diameter	Mass	Strike tone (HT-^{1}/_{16})	Tower
1	Apostel	1886	Friedrich Hamm, Frankenthal	1,655 mm (65.2 in)	≈2,430 kg (5,360 lb)	h^{0} +5	South-East, lower
2	Kunigunde	ca. 1185	unknown	1,589 / 1,590 / 1,596 mm (62.6 / 62.6 / 62.8 in)	≈3,450 kg (7,610 lb)	c^{1} +13	North-East, upper
3	Heinrich	13.8.1311	unknown	1,799 mm (70.8 in)	≈5,200 kg (11,500 lb)	cis^{1} +9	North-East, lower
4	Maria	1735	Johann Ignatius Höhn, Bamberg	1,335 mm (52.6 in)	≈1,500 kg (3,300 lb)	dis^{1} +5	South-East, upper
5	Georg	1972	Rudolf Perner, Passau	1,090 mm (43 in)	780 kg (1,720 lb)	fis^{1} +10+	South-East, upper
6	Peter	1972	Rudolf Perner, Passau	985 mm (38.8 in)	556 kg (1,226 lb)	gis^{1} +7	South-East, upper
7	Otto	1972	Rudolf Perner, Passau	822 mm (32.4 in)	310 kg (680 lb)	h^{1} +11−	South-East, upper
8	Michael	1972	Rudolf Perner, Passau	653 mm (25.7 in)	170 kg (370 lb)	dis^{2} +9,5	South-East, upper
9	Armeseelen	ca. 1200	unknown	837 / 844 mm (33.0 / 33.2 in)	570 kg (1,260 lb)	fis^{2} −1	South-East, upper
10	Messe	ca. 1300	unknown	591 mm (23.3 in)	≈200 kg (440 lb)	gis^{2} −7	South-East, upper

Name	Year of Cast	Caster	Diameter	Mass	Strike tone (HT-^{1}/_{16})
Zapfendorfer oder Laudes	ca. 1200	unknown (vgl. Armeseelenglocke)	745 mm (29.3 in)	≈400 kg (880 lb)	gis^{2} −5

=== Further structures ===
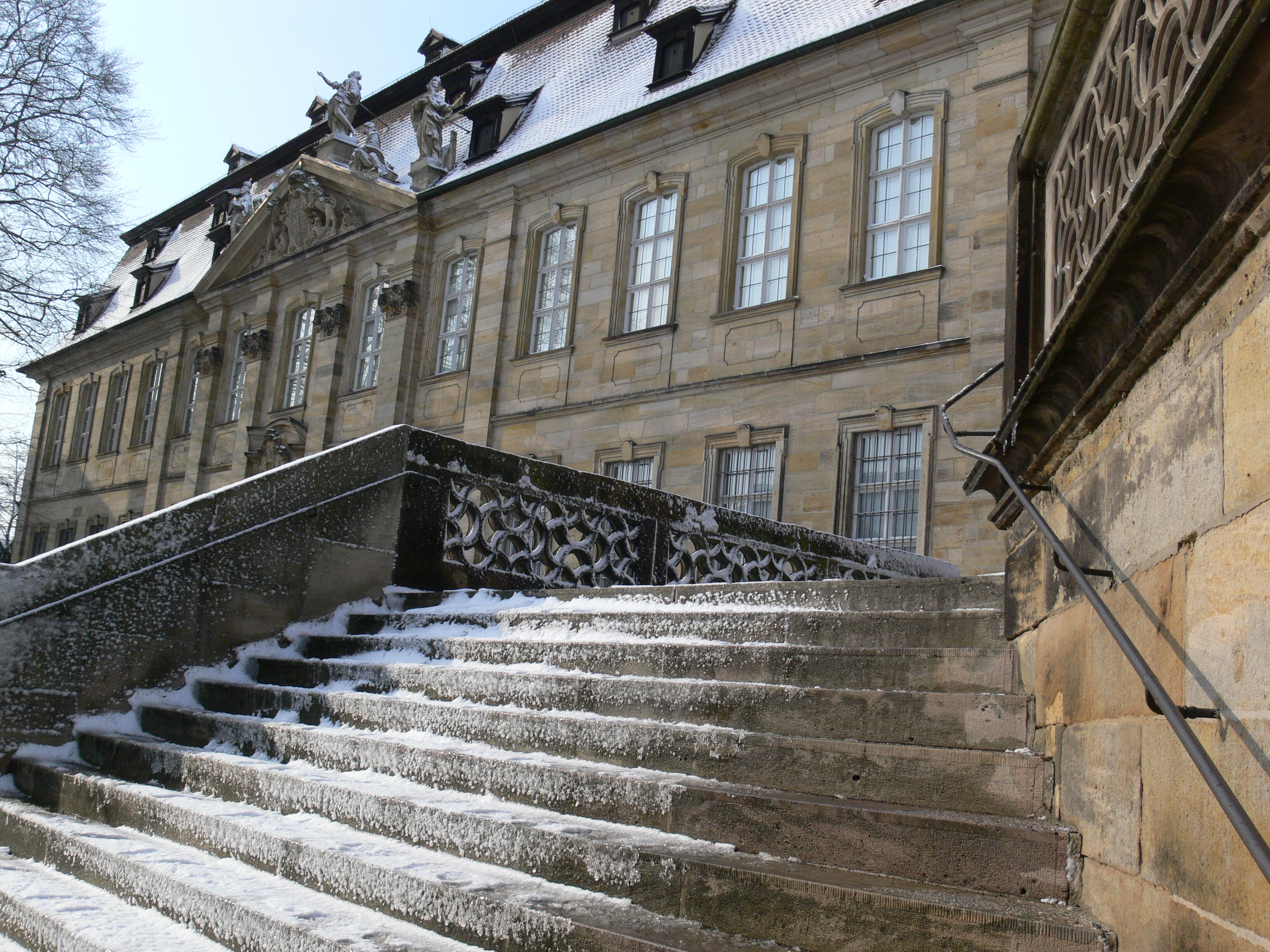
Domkranz and Neumann's chapter house

The cloisters and the nearby chapter house by Balthasar Neumann today house the Diözesanmuseum Bamberg (cathedral museum).

The Domkranz is a terrace reached by two broad stairways from the Domplatz. From here the Adamspforte and the Gnadenpforte give access to the cathedral.

=== Domplatz ===
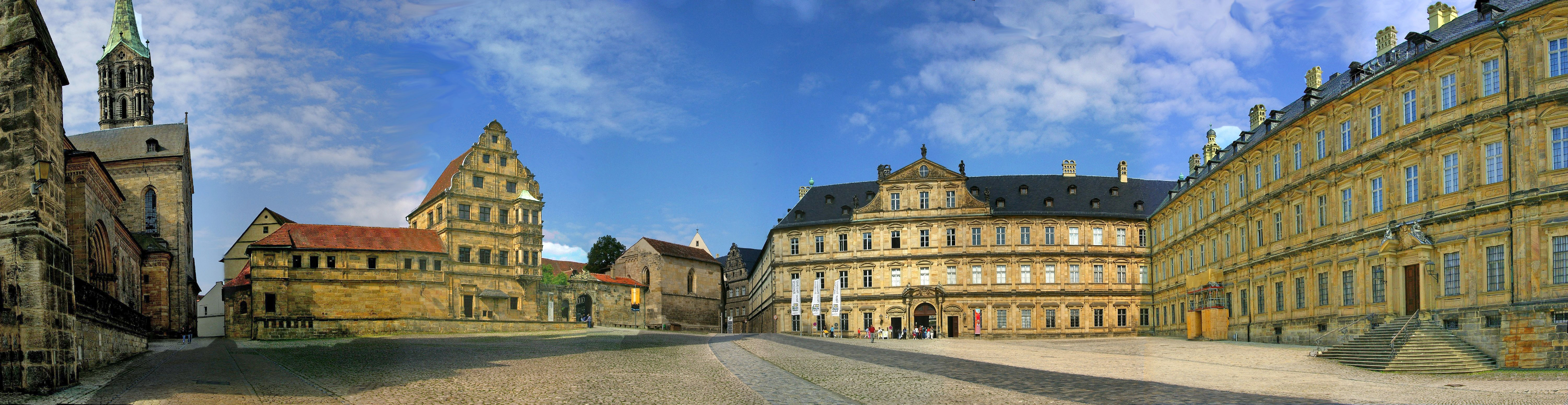
Domplatz: Cathedral, Alte Hofhaltung and Neue Residenz (from left)

The cathedral square is also fronted by the Renaissance buildings of the Alte Hofhaltung and the Baroque Neue Residenz, the palaces of the bishops from the 15th century to 1602 and from 1602 to 1803, respectively.

Originally known as Hofplatz or Burgplatz, after secularization the square was renamed Karolinenplatz in honour of the then Queen of Bavaria, Karoline. Only in 1949, did Domplatz become the official name for the area. Previously, this had been limited to just the immediate surroundings of the cathedral.

== In popular culture ==
Bamberg Cathedral (in-game name Regnitz Cathedral) is the Religious Castle Age landmark of the Holy Roman Empire civilization in Age of Empires IV.

== See also ==
- Ulrich of Bamberg
