= Herman I of Bamberg =

German bishop and royal chaplain

Herman I was bishop of Bamberg from 1065 until 1075. He was a royal chaplain of King Henry IV of Germany before his appointment to the bishopric. His favoritism towards monastic communities brought him into conflict with the canons of the Bamberg Cathedral.

== Sources ==
- Brook, Christopher (2014) [1964]. Europe in the Central Middle Ages: 962-1154. Routledge. ISBN 978-0-582-36904-7.
- Robinson, I. S. (2003) [1999]. Henry IV of Germany, 1056-1106. Cambridge University Press. ISBN 0-521-54590-0.
