= 1152 imperial election =

Frederick Barbarossa was elected King of Germany on 4 March 1152 in Frankfurt am Main. Frederick's uncle, Otto of Freising, was an eyewitness and is the most important source for the 1152 election. According to him, "the entire company of the princes ... from the immense extent of the transalpine realm (as well as certain barons from Italy)" met in Frankfurt by early March to elect a successor to King Conrad III, who had died barely two weeks earlier at Bamberg on 15 February 1152. Only five days after his election, on 9 March, Frederick was crowned in the Aachen Chapel.

== Unusual haste in deciding the election ==
The apparent quickness of the election of 1152 contrasts with those of 1125 and 1138. In his own letter to Otto of Freising listing the accomplishments of his first five years on the throne, Frederick does not mention his election, but says only that "we were anointed at Aachen and received the crown of the German realm." According to Otto, Conrad had on his deathbed designated Frederick as his choice of successor, because he knew that the princes would not elect his young son, Frederick. He then entrusted his son and the royal insignia to Frederick.

== Reasons for Frederick's political supporters ==
Conrad's designation was not sufficient to make Frederick king or determine his election. This is shown from a diploma—D.38 in Heinrich Appelt's edition of Frederick diplomas—drawn up for Alteburg Abbey during the brief interregnum. A blank space was left for the king's name and Frederick himself was a witness to the document as Duke of Swabia. As king, he confirmed the document in December and his name was then added by a notary to the blank space. Since no document was issued during Frederick's brief time in Frankfurt, the names of those participating in his election are not directly attested and can only be inferred. The witness list of D.38 offers some evidence of those present for the negotiations or debate on Conrad's succession. Frederick's cousin Henry the Lion was among them. According to Otto, the princes choice of Frederick was unanimous. They preferred him for his proven valour and his descent from "two renowned families", the Staufer on his father's side and the Welfs on his mother's. It was thought that Frederick could bring a measure of stability of "universal advantage" to the kingdom.

== Letter to Pope Eugene III concerning the election's results ==
Frederick sent a letter—Appelt's D.5—to inform Pope Eugene III of his election. It was carried by Bishop Eberhard II of Bamberg, who has been accused of altering the text of the only copy that survives in Wibald of Stavelot's letter book.

== Bibliography ==
- Freed, John B. (2016). Frederick Barbarossa: The Prince and the Myth. Yale University Press.
- Reuter, Timothy (1977). "Review of Die Urkunden Friedrichs I. 1152–1158 by Heinrich Appelt". The English Historical Review. 92 (364): 596–598. doi:10.1093/ehr/XCII.CCCLXIV.596. JSTOR 566080.
- Weiler, Björn (2012). "Tales of Trickery and Deceit: The Election of Frederick Barbarossa (1152), Historical Memory and the Culture of Kingship in Later Staufen Germany". Journal of Medieval History. 38 (3): 295–317. doi:10.1080/03044181.2012.694336. S2CID 153508121.
