= Karl Braun (bishop) =

German Roman Catholic archbishop (born 1930)

The Most Reverend Karl Heinrich Braun
- Archbishop Emeritus of Bamberg
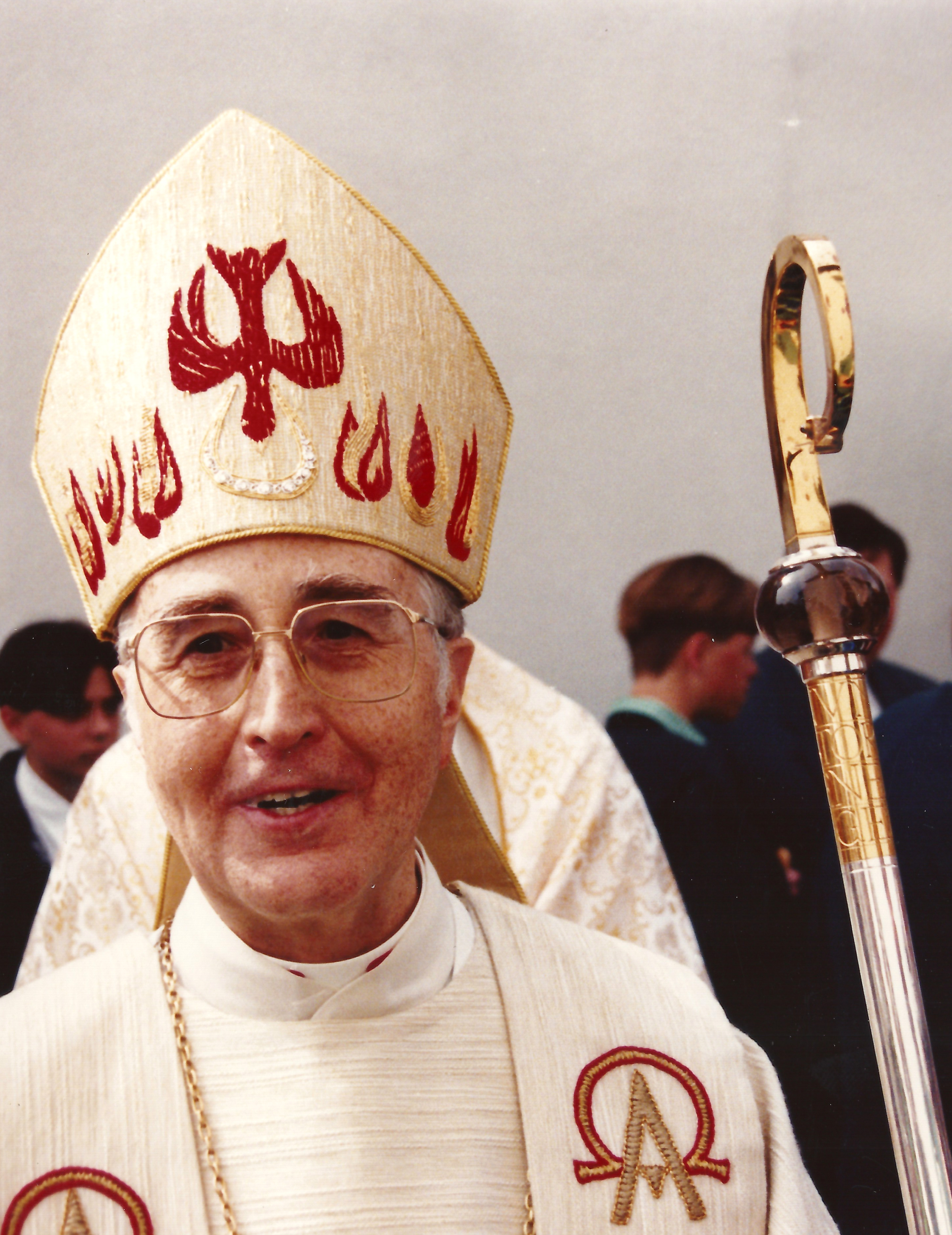
- Church: Roman Catholic Church
- Archdiocese: Bamberg
- Appointed: 25 March 1995
- Term ended: 2 July 2001
- Predecessor: Elmar Maria Kredel
- Successor: Ludwig Schick
- Previous post: Bishop of Eichstätt (1984–1995)

Orders
- Ordination: 10 October 1958
- Consecration: 16 June 1984 by Joseph Stimpfle

Personal details
- Born: Karl-Heinz Braun; 13 December 1930 (age 95) Kempten, Bavaria, Weimar Republic
- Education: Pontifical Gregorian University
- Coat of arms

Karl Heinrich Braun (born 13 December 1930), also known as Karl Braun, is a German Roman Catholic prelate, who served as Bishop of Eichstätt from 1984 to 1995 and as Archbishop of Bamberg from 1995 until his resignation in 2001.

== Early life and education ==
Braun was born on 13 December 1930 in Kempten in the Allgäu region of Bavaria, Germany. He studied philosophy and Catholic theology at the Pontifical Gregorian University in Rome beginning in 1952. He was ordained a priest for the Diocese of Augsburg on 10 October 1958 in Rome.

He later earned a doctorate in canon law (Dr. iur. can.) and served in pastoral ministry and diocesan administration in Augsburg.

== Bishop of Eichstätt ==
On 17 April 1984, Braun was appointed Bishop of Eichstätt by Pope John Paul II. He was consecrated bishop on 16 June 1984 by Bishop Joseph Stimpfle.

During his tenure in Eichstätt, he served as Grand Chancellor of the Catholic University of Eichstätt-Ingolstadt and supported the university's academic development.

== Archbishop of Bamberg ==
On 25 March 1995, Braun was appointed Archbishop of Bamberg by Pope John Paul II. He was installed on 28 May 1995.

As archbishop, he emphasized pastoral renewal, theological education, and dialogue within the Church.

On 2 July 2001, his resignation was accepted by Pope John Paul II for reasons of health.

== Later life ==
After his retirement, Braun resided in Bamberg and remained active in pastoral and theological matters within the archdiocese.
