= Lupold of Bebenburg =

German bishop and writer

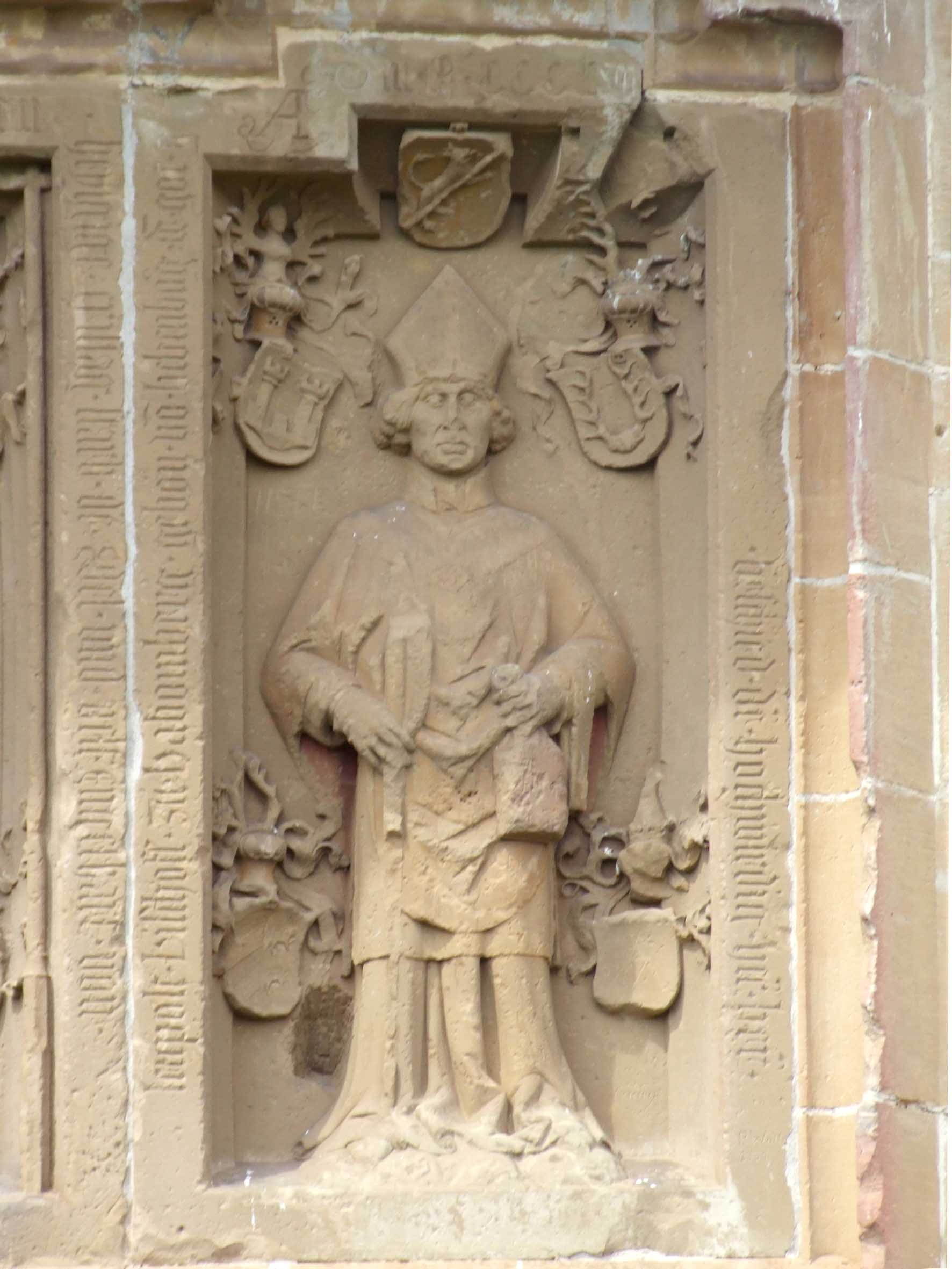
Lupold of Bebenburg

Lupold of Bebenburg (German: Lupold von Bebenburg; born c. 1297, died 28 October 1363) was the Bishop of Bamberg from 1353 (as Leopold III). He is best known for his political writings.

Lupold was born at Bebenburg Castle around 1297 to of a Franconian family of ministeriales. With the financial support of a canonry at Würzburg Cathedral, he studied canon law at Bologna under Johannes Andreae. He graduated doctor decretorum in 1316. After returning to Germany, he became provost of the church of St Severus in Erfurt in 1326, a canon of Mainz Cathedral in 1327, then archdeacon at Würzburg and a canon at Bamberg Cathedral in 1329. From 1328 he was intermittently an episcopal official at Würzburg. This important position allowed him to play a part in episcopal elections and political decision-making. He was an influential figure in the diocese of Würzburg.

In 1338 Lupold was excommunicated by the pope for having taken the side of the Emperor Louis IV. He was not absolved until 1351. On 12 January 1353 he was elected bishop of Bamberg, his native diocese, and remained there until his death on 28 October 1363.

In the struggle between Louis IV and Popes John XXII, Benedict XII, and Clement VI, Lupold was among the jurists who took the emperor's side. His treatise De juribus regni et imperii Romanorum, dedicated to Louis' supporter, the elector Baldwin of Trier, deals less with abstract ideas and Aristotelian politics than with historical considerations.

Two minor works of Lupold's have also been preserved, one in praise of the devotion of the old German princes to the Church, the other a lament over the condition of the Holy Roman Empire.

== Works ==
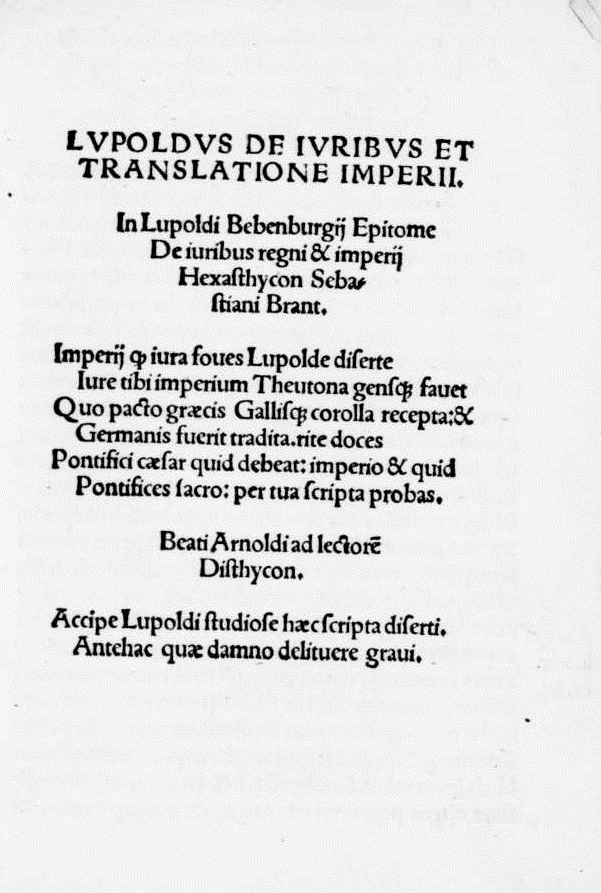
De iuribus et translatione imperii, 1508

- Liber de juribus Regni et Imperii Romanorum (written about 1338-1340), Strasbourg, 1504.
  - De iuribus et translatione imperii (in Latin). Strasbourg: Matthias Schürer. 1508.
- De zelo veterorum Regum Galliae et Germaniae Principum (1341-1342).
- Ritmaticum querolosum et lamentosum dictamen de modernis cursibus et defectibus regni ac imperii Romanorum
- Libellus de zelo christiane religionis veterum principum Germanorum
- Liber privilegiorum, 1346
- Liber de ortu, cursu et occasu Karoli Magni et suorum successorum imperatorum et regum Romanorum (1325-1363), 1349
