= Herwig Gössl =

German Catholic archbishop (born 1967)

- Archbishop of Bamberg
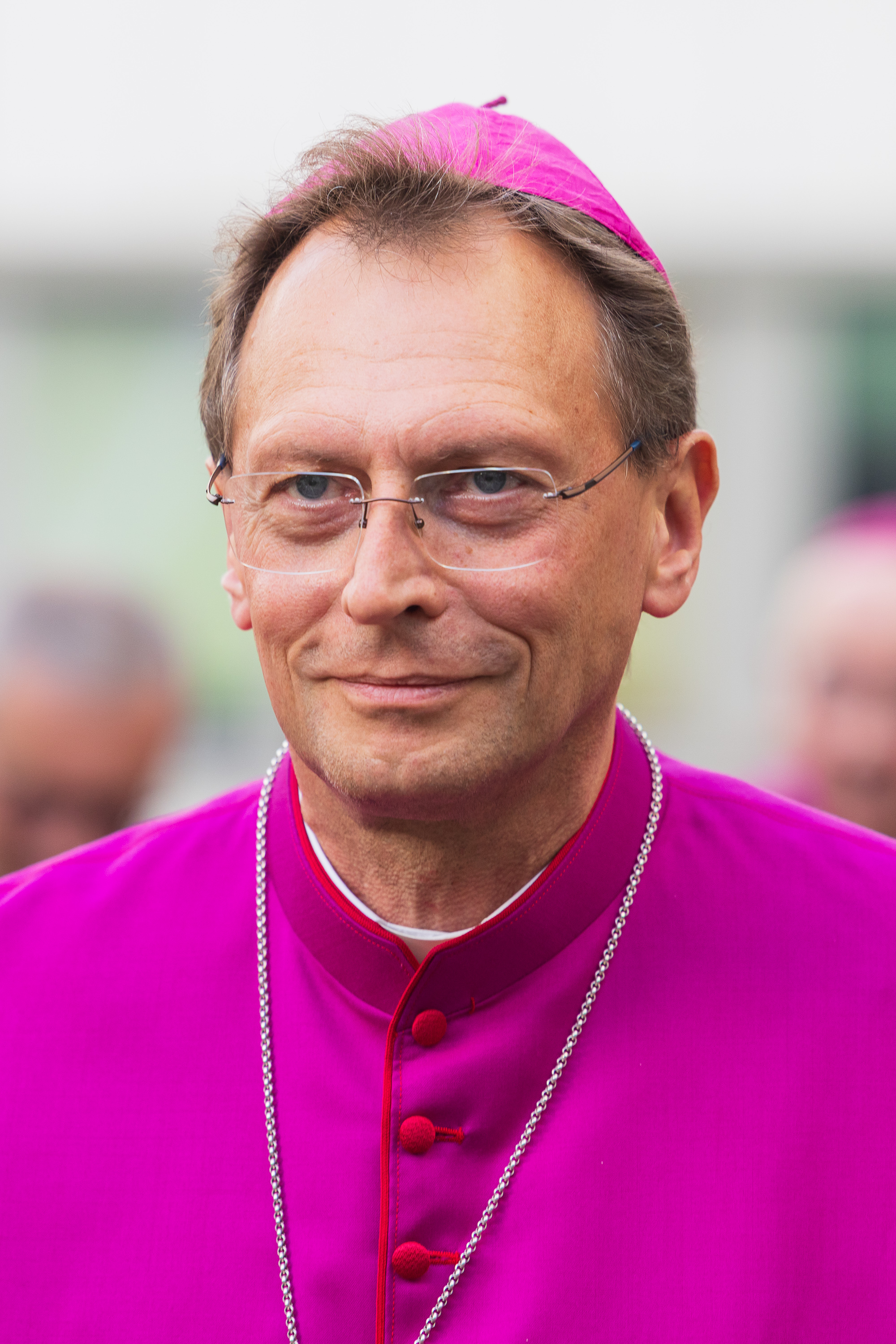
- Gössl in 2023
- Church: Roman Catholic
- Archdiocese: Bamberg
- Appointed: 9 December 2023
- Predecessor: Ludwig Schick
- Previous post: Auxiliary Bishop of Bamberg (2014–2023)

Orders
- Ordination: 26 June 1993 by Elmar Maria Kredel

Personal details
- Born: 22 February 1967 (age 59) Munich, Bavaria, West Germany
- Education: Catholic Seminary Bamberg
- Motto: tu solus dominus ('You alone are the lord')
- Coat of arms

Herwig Gössl (born 22 February 1967) is a German prelate of the Catholic Church, who has served as the Archbishop of Bamberg since 2023. A native of Munich, he held several appointments in the same archdiocese, including as the vice-rector of its seminary, before becoming an auxiliary bishop in 2014. After the resignation as archbishop of Ludwig Schick in 2022, Gössl initially led the archdiocese as a diocesan administrator.

== Early life and education ==
Herwig Gössl was born on 22 February 1967 in Munich. He grew up in Nuremberg and attended the city's Melanchthon-Gymnasium. In 1986, having received his Abitur, he enrolled in the Catholic Seminary at Bamberg and was ordained a priest on 26 June 1993 by Elmar Maria Kredel, then the Archbishop of Bamberg.

== Ecclesiastical career ==
Gössl's first appointment was as a chaplain at St Hedwig's Church in Bayreuth. In 1997, he became the parish priest for Hannberg and Weisendorf, two communities in the Deanery of Erlangen. In 2007, Ludwig Schick, the Archbishop of Bamberg, appointed Gössl as vice-rector of the Bamberg seminary, which he had attended as a student. A year later, he was appointed to the same position at the Catholic Seminary at Würzburg by Friedhelm Hofmann, the Bishop of Würzburg. In this role, he co-ordinated the educational activities of the dioceses of Bamberg and Würzburg.

In 2014, Gössl was made an auxiliary bishop in the Archdiocese of Bamberg. According to Christoph Renzikowski of Katholische Nachrichten-Agentur, a catholic news agency, the news of the appointment caused him "great shock" (German: "großen Schreck"). When Ludwig Schick resigned from the office of archbishop in November 2022, Gössl was elected diocesan administrator and led the Archdiocese of Bamberg during the resulting vacancy. On 9 December 2023, Pope Francis named Gössl the new Archbishop of Bamberg.

== Theological positions ==
During the Synodal Way, a series of conferences involving both laity and clergy discussing paths towards reform of the Catholic Church in Germany, Gössl was part of the commission working on the church's ethics of sexuality. In this context, he suggested that, although catholic theology of sexuality had at times in the past gone too far, it was "wrong" (German: "falsch") to view the church's teaching on sexuality as responsible for the incidents of sexual abuse of children under its tutelage. Along with a minority of bishops including Stefan Oster, the Bishop of Passau, Gössl rejected a fundamental document prepared by the commission due to disagreements with the wording including on the "tendency to abolish the bipolarity of genders" (German: "die Tendenz, die Bipolarität der Geschlechter aufzuheben"). However, he later welcomed the Fiducia supplicans declaration, which allowed Catholic clergy to bless homosexual couples, and criticised the Vatican's decision to continue labelling homosexuality as a 'grave sin'.

When Frauke Brosius-Gersdorf was nominated as a candidate for the Federal Constitutional Court, earlier remarks she made about the right for abortion were widely discussed. Gössl told the press, that the position of the church was contradictory of Brosius-Gersdorfs. He insisted that there can be no gradation of the right to life. Two days after the statement and after a phone call with Brosius-Gersdorf, Gössel revoked his critique and stated he did have false information about her positions.

== Bibliography ==
- "Lebenslauf". Erzbistum Bamberg (in German). Archived from the original on 2023-12-04.
- Renzikowski, Christopher (2023-12-09). "Hauslösung in Bamberg: Herwig Gössl wird neuer Erzbischof". katholisch.de (in German).
- "Bamberg: Herwig Gössl wird neuer Erzbischof". Die Tagespost (in German). 2023-12-09.
- "Vorstoß ohne Weiterentwicklung der Lehre". domradio.de (in German). 2024-01-05.
