= Cunegundes =

Cunegundes may refer to:

- Cunigunde of Luxembourg (c. 975–1040), also called St. Cunegundes and St. Cunegonda, wife of the Holy Roman Emperor Saint Henry II
- Kinga of Poland (1234–1292), also known as Saint Cunegundes
