= Eberhard II von Otelingen =

Bishop of Roman Catholic Archdiocese of Bamberg, Germany

Eberhard II von Otelingen (born 1100) was a German clergyman and bishop for the Roman Catholic Archdiocese of Bamberg. He became ordained in 1146. He was appointed bishop in 1146. He died in 1170.
