= Joseph von Schork =

German archbishop

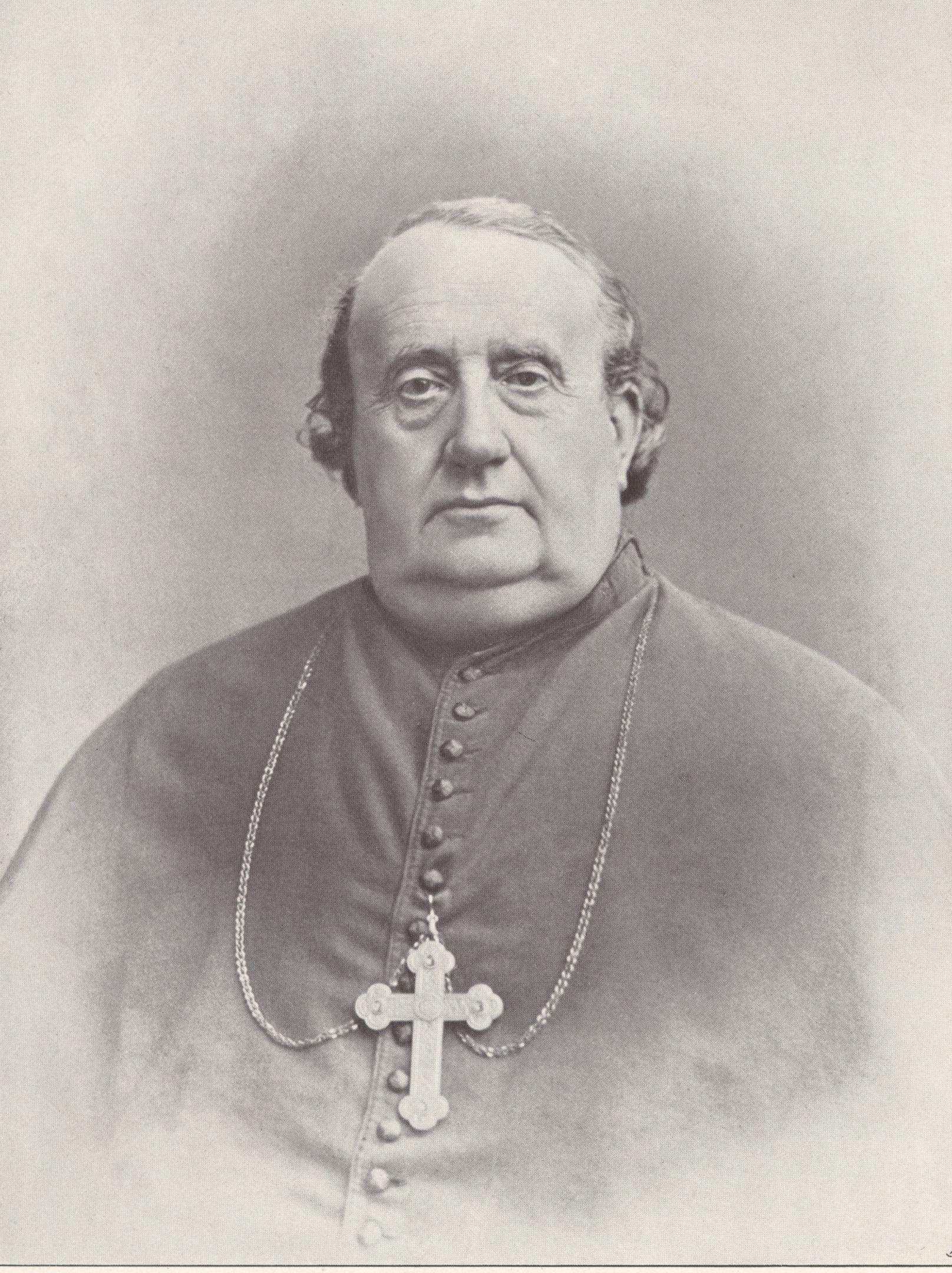
- Joseph von Schork, c. 1900
- Archdiocese: Bamberg
- Appointed: 26 August 1890
- Predecessor: Joseph Friedrich von Schreiber
- Successor: Friedrich Philipp von Abert

Orders
- Ordination: 2 August 1854
- Consecration: by Franz Joseph von Stein

Personal details
- Born: 7 December 1829 Kleinheubach, Bavaria
- Died: 25 January 1905 (aged 75) Bamberg, Bavaria

Joseph von Schork (7 December 1829 - 25 January 1905) was Archbishop of Bamberg from 1890 to the time of his death.

== Early life and education ==
Born to a coachman in the service of the princes of Löwenstein-Wertheim-Rosenberg, von Schork attended Latin school in Miltenberg and the grammar school and lyceum in Aschaffenburg. Following this, he went on to study theology in Würzburg.

== Career ==
Joseph von Schork was ordained in 1854 and began his career as a priest and school inspector in Würzburg. He was elected provost in 1889 and appointed as Archbishop of Bamberg in 1890 by Pope Leo XIII.
