= Archdiocese of Bamberg =

Latin Catholic jurisdiction in Germany

Archdiocese of Bamberg Archidioecesis Bambergensis Metropolitanerzbistum Bamberg

Catholic
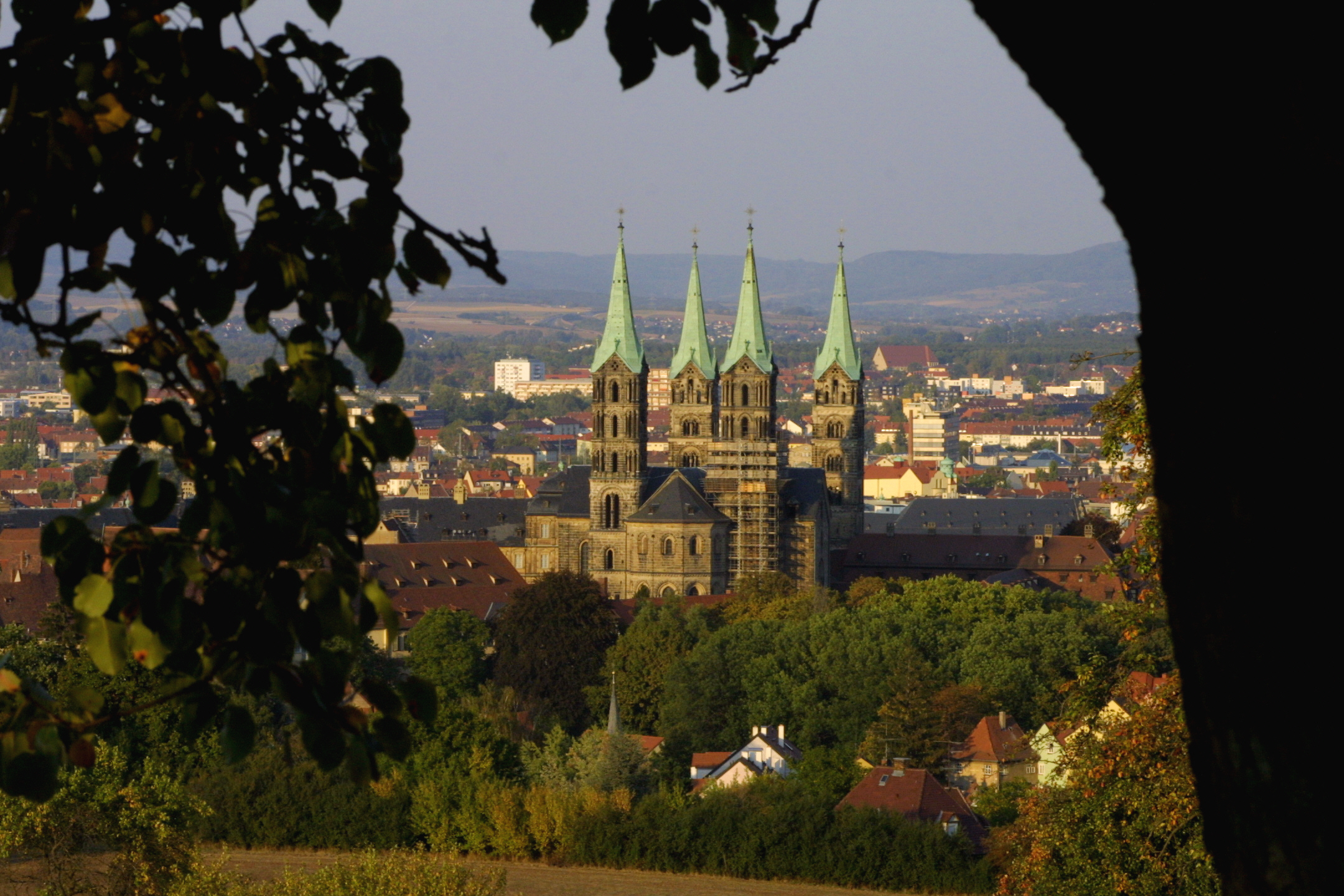
- Bamberg Cathedral

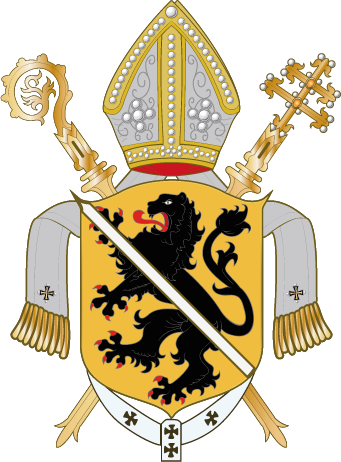
- Coat of arms

Location
- Country: Germany
- Ecclesiastical province: Bamberg

Statistics
- Area: 10,290 km^{2} (3,970 sq mi)
- Population: Total; Catholics: (as of 2022); 2,116,121; 644,200 (30.4%)
- Parishes: 310

Information
- Denomination: Catholic Church
- Sui iuris church: Latin Church
- Rite: Roman Rite
- Established: 1 November 1007
- Cathedral: Bamberg Cathedral
- Patron saint: St. Cunegundes; St. Otto of Bamberg; St. Henry II
- Secular priests: 295 (Diocesan); 98 (Religious Orders); 51 Permanent Deacons

Current leadership
- Pope: Leo XIV
- Archbishop: Herwig Gössl
- Suffragans: Speyer; Eichstätt; Würzburg
- Bishops emeritus: Karl Heinrich Braun; Ludwig Schick

Map
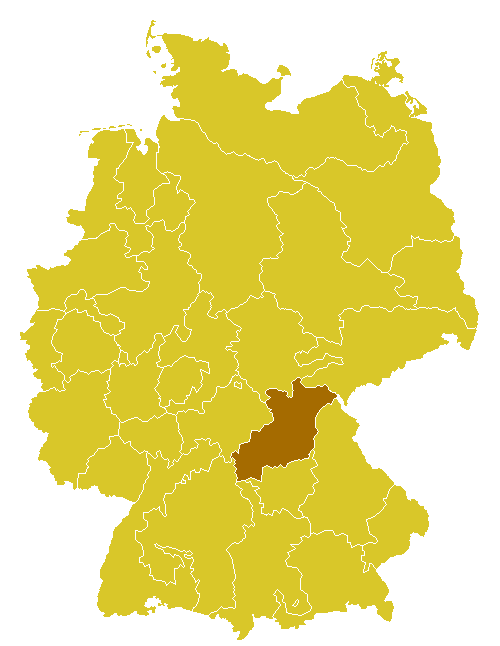

Website
- eo-bamberg.de

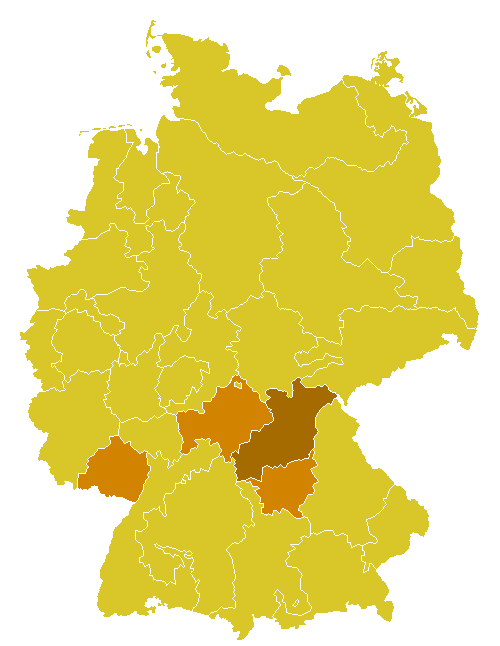
Ecclesiastical province of Bamberg

The Archdiocese of Bamberg (Latin: Archidioecesis Bambergensis) is a Latin Church diocese of the Catholic Church in Bavaria, one of 27 in Germany. In 2015, 32.9% of the population identified as Catholic, and 15.6% of those reported that they attend Mass on Sunday—a relatively high number in Germany. The archdiocese comprises the majority of the administrative regions of Upper Franconia and Middle Franconia, as well as a small part of Lower Franconia and the Upper Palatinate. Its seat is Bamberg. The dioceses of Speyer, Eichstätt, and Würzburg are subordinate to it. The diocese was founded in 1007 out of parts of the dioceses of Eichstätt and Würzburg. In 1817, the diocese was raised to an archdiocese.

== History ==
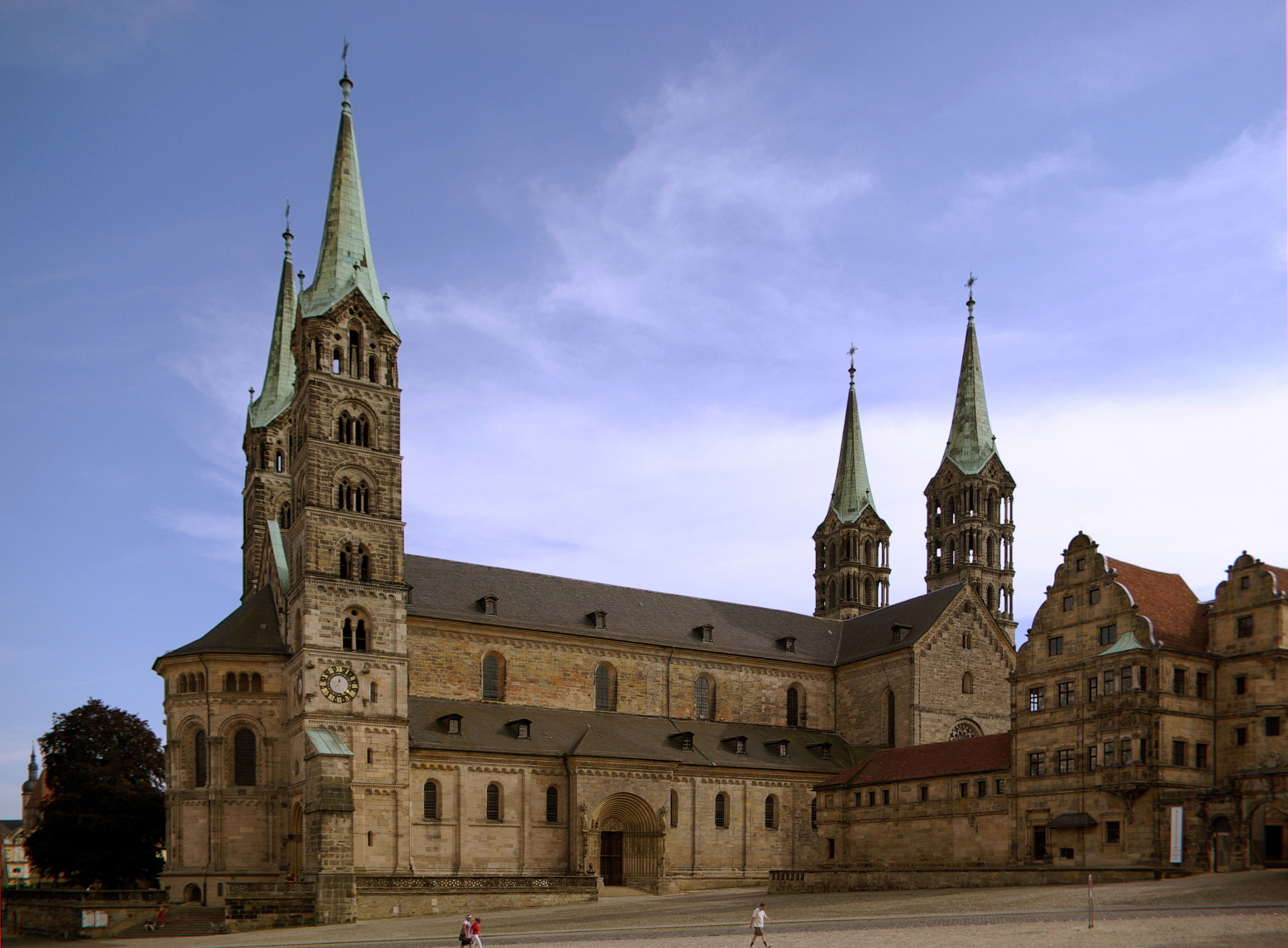
Bamberg Cathedral

On 1 November 1007, a synod was held in Frankfurt. Eight archbishops and twenty-seven bishops were present at the synod, as well as the German King Henry II. Henry II intended to create a new diocese that would aid in the final conquest of paganism in the area around Bamberg. But the territory of the Wends on the upper Main, the Wiesent, and the Aisch had belonged to the Diocese of Würzburg since the organization of the Middle German bishoprics by St. Boniface, so that no new diocese could be erected without the consent of the occupant of that see. The bishop of Würzburg did not object to parting with some of his territory, especially as the king promised to have Würzburg raised to an archbishopric and to give him an equivalent in Meiningen. The consent of Pope John XVII was obtained for this arrangement, but the elevation of Würzburg to an archbishopric proved impracticable, and its bishop withdrew his consent.

At the synod, Henry obtained permission for the foundation of the diocese of Bamberg from parts of the dioceses of Würzburg and Eichstätt. Bamberg was made directly subordinate to Rome. It was also decided that Eberhard, the king's chancellor, would be ordained by the archbishop of Mainz, Willigis, to be the head of the new border area diocese. The new diocese had expensive gifts at the synod, confirmed by documents, to place it on a solid foundation. Henry wanted the celebrated monastic rigour and studiousness of the Hildesheim cathedral chapter – Henry himself was educated there – linked together with the churches under his control, including his favourite diocese of Bamberg. The next seven bishops were named by the emperors, after which free canonical election was the rule. Eberhard's immediate successor, Suidger of Morsleben, became pope in 1046 as Clement II. He was the only pope to be interred north of the Alps in the Bamberg Cathedral. In the thirteenth century, the diocese gradually became a territorial principality, and its bishops took secular precedence next after the archbishops; Bishop Henry I was the first prince-bishop.

The fortieth bishop, George III of Limburg (1505–22), was inclined toward the Reformation, which caused a violent social outbreak under his successor Weigand (1522–56), and the city suffered severely in the Second Margrave War (1552–55), as well as in the Thirty Years' War, when it was placed under the jurisdiction of Bernard, the new Duke of Franconia.

At the Peace of Westphalia (1648), the bishops recovered their possessions. In 1802, in the course of the German mediatization, the prince-bishopric was secularized and its territory annexed to Bavaria. From 1808 to 1817 the diocese was vacant; but by the Bavarian Concordat of the latter year it was made an archbishopric, with Würzburg, Speyer, and Eichstädt as suffragan sees.

== See also ==
- Prince-Bishopric of Bamberg
