= Ludwig Schick =

Catholic clergyman and archbishop

His Excellency Ludwig Schick
- Archbishop Emeritus of Bamberg
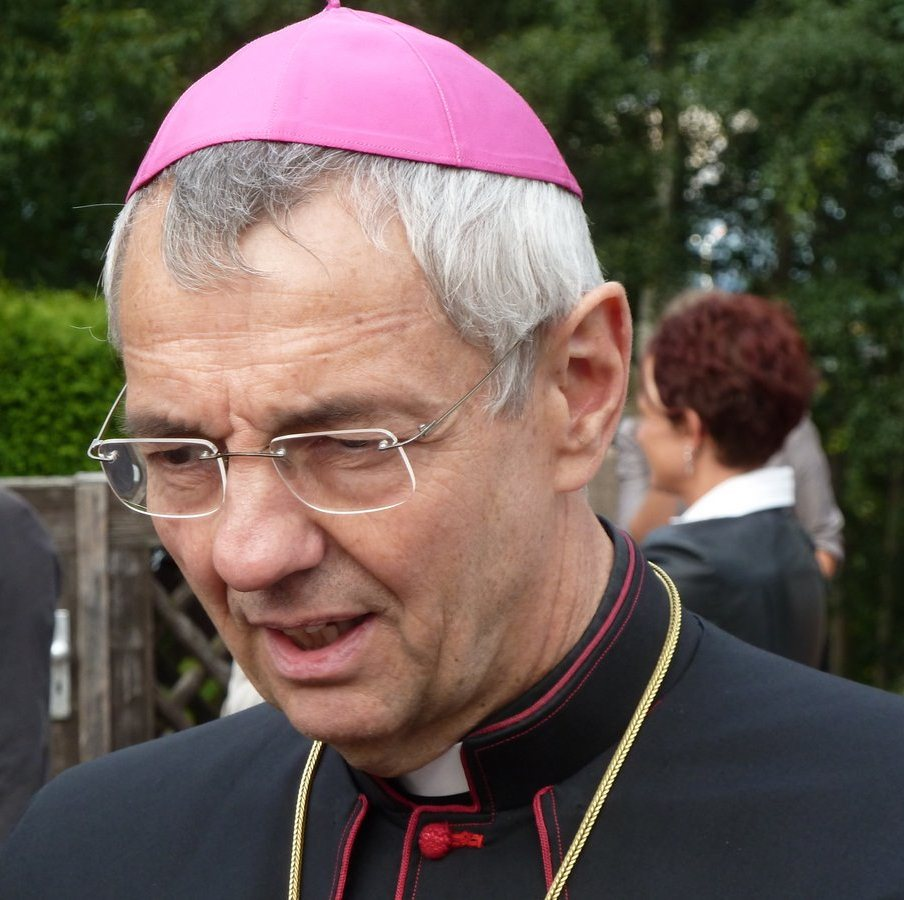
- Ludwig Schick in 2011
- Church: Roman Catholic
- Archdiocese: Bamberg
- Installed: 28 June 2002
- Term ended: 1 November 2022
- Predecessor: Karl Heinrich Braun
- Previous post: Auxiliary Bishop of Fulda (1998-2002)

Orders
- Ordination: 15 June 1975 by Eduard Schick
- Consecration: 12 July 1998 by Johannes Dyba

Personal details
- Born: September 22, 1949 (age 76) Marburg, West Germany
- Coat of arms

Ludwig Schick (born 22 September 1949) is a prelate of the Roman Catholic Church. He served as archbishop of Bamberg from 2002 to 2022. He was auxiliary bishop of Fulda from 1998 to 2002.

== Life ==
Born in Marburg, Schick was ordained to the priesthood on 15 June 1975, serving in Fulda.

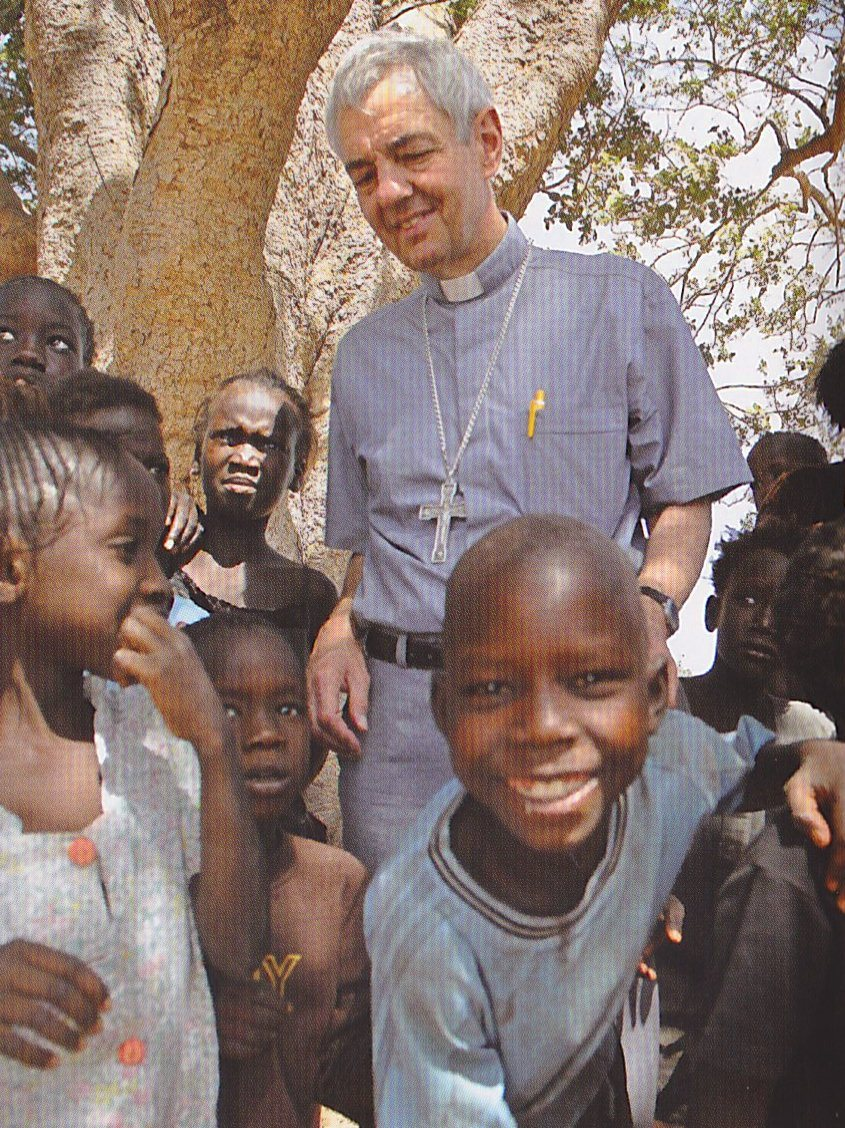
In Africa (2009)

On 20 May 1998, he was appointed auxiliary bishop of Fulda and titular bishop of Auzia. Schick received his episcopal consecration on the following 12 July from Johannes Dyba, archbishop-bishop of Fulda, with the auxiliary bishop of Fulda, Johannes Kapp, and the bishop of San Marcos, Alvaro Leonel Ramazzini Imeri, serving as co-consecrators.

On 28 June 2002, he was appointed archbishop of Bamberg.

In 2021, he worked along with the German bishops to deliver aid to famine-hit southern Madagascar during the food crisis that began there in mid-2021. He had previously visited Madagascar.

Pope Francis accepted his resignation on 1 November 2022.
