= 1065 =

1065 in various calendars
- Gregorian calendar: 1065; MLXV
- Ab urbe condita: 1818
- Armenian calendar: 514; ԹՎ ՇԺԴ
- Assyrian calendar: 5815
- Balinese saka calendar: 986–987
- Bengali calendar: 471–472
- Berber calendar: 2015
- English Regnal year: N/A
- Buddhist calendar: 1609
- Burmese calendar: 427
- Byzantine calendar: 6573–6574
- Chinese calendar: 甲辰年 (Wood Dragon); 3762 or 3555 — to — 乙巳年 (Wood Snake); 3763 or 3556
- Coptic calendar: 781–782
- Discordian calendar: 2231
- Ethiopian calendar: 1057–1058
- Hebrew calendar: 4825–4826
- Hindu calendars
- Vikram Samvat: 1121–1122
- Shaka Samvat: 986–987
- Kali Yuga: 4165–4166
- Holocene calendar: 11065
- Igbo calendar: 65–66
- Iranian calendar: 443–444
- Islamic calendar: 457–458
- Japanese calendar: Kōhei 8 / Jiryaku 1 (治暦元年)
- Javanese calendar: 968–969
- Julian calendar: 1065; MLXV
- Korean calendar: 3398
- Minguo calendar: 847 before ROC 民前847年
- Nanakshahi calendar: −403
- Seleucid era: 1376/1377 AG
- Thai solar calendar: 1607–1608
- Tibetan calendar: ཤིང་ཕོ་འབྲུག་ལོ་ (male Wood-Dragon); 1191 or 810 or 38 — to — ཤིང་མོ་སྦྲུལ་ལོ་ (female Wood-Snake); 1192 or 811 or 39

Year 1065 (MLXV) was a common year starting on Saturday of the Julian calendar.

== Events ==
=== By place ===
==== Europe ====
- December 24 – King Ferdinand I of León ("the Great") dies in León, Spain, after an 11-year reign as Emperor of All Spain. His kingdom is divided among his three sons: the eldest Sancho II, the second Alfonso VI and the youngest García II. The kingdoms of Galicia and Portugal become independent under the rule of García.

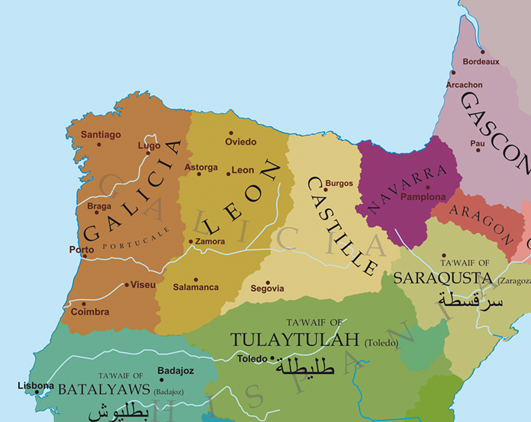
Political situation in the Northern Iberian Peninsula around 1065: Garcia II's domains (Galicia) Badajoz, owing tribute to Garcia Seville, owing tribute to Garcia Alfonso VI's domains (León) Toledo, owing tribute to Alfonso Sancho II's domains (Castile) Zaragoza, owing tribute to Sancho

==== England ====
- October 3 – Northumbria revolts against Tostig Godwinson, who is exiled. He takes refuge with his brother-in-law, Count Baldwin V in Flanders (modern Belgium). The Northumbrian nobles choose Morcar (or Morkere) as earl at York.
- December 28 – Westminster Abbey is consecrated by King Edward the Confessor.

==== Seljuk Empire ====
- Alp Arslan, leader of the Seljuk Turks, campaigns against the Kipchaks and the Türkmen in Central Asia. He captures the city of Kars and plunders the western provinces of Georgia.

==== China ====
- Sima Guang, chancellor of the Song dynasty, heads a team of scholars in initiating the compilation of an enormous written universal history of China, known as the Zizhi Tongjian.

=== By topic ===
==== Religion ====
- Great German Pilgrimage of 1064–65: A large pilgrimage led by Siegfried I (archbishop of Mainz) arrives in Jerusalem after having been attacked by Bedouin bandits. Two weeks later (in April) they return to Ramla and take ships back to Latakia.
- Gregory II the Martyrophile is consecrated as catholicos of the Armenian church in Tzamandos

==== Astronomy ====
- A "guest star" (i.e. a nova of some kind) is observed from China. It may be related to the Strottner-Drechsler Object 20 nebula.

== Births ==
- Agnes of Rheinfelden, duchess of Swabia (d. 1111)
- Callixtus II, pope of the Catholic Church (d. 1124)
- Guarinus of Sitten, bishop of Sion (approximate date)
- Henry I (the Long), German nobleman (d. 1087)
- Hugh VII of Lusignan, count of La Marche (d. 1151)
- Humbert II (the Fat), count of Savoy (d. 1103)
- Li Jie, Chinese writer of the Song dynasty (d. 1110)
- Niels (or Nicholas), king of Denmark (d. 1134)
- Richard de Montfort, French nobleman (d. 1092)
- Robert II, count of Flanders (approximate date)
- Sibylla of Burgundy, duchess of Burgundy (approximate date)
- Stephen I, count palatine of Burgundy (d. 1102)
- Vladislaus I, duke of Bohemia (approximate date)
- Walter Tirel (or William Rufus), English nobleman

== Deaths ==
- February 7 – Siegfried I, count of Sponheim
- May 17 – Egilbert (or Engelbert), bishop of Passau
- May 18 – Frederick, duke of Lower Lorraine
- June 27 – George the Hagiorite, Georgian calligrapher (b. 1009)
- July 22 – Ibn Abi Hasina, Arab poet and panegyrist (b. 998)
- July 23 – Gunther of Bamberg, German nobleman
- December 24 – Ferdinand I (the Great), king of León and Castile
- Diarmaid mac Tadgh Ua Ceallaigh, king of Uí Maine
- Ermengol III (or Armengol), count of Urgell (b. 1032)
- Gisela (or Gizella), queen consort of Hungary (b. 985)
- Gomes Echigues, Portuguese knight and governor (b. 1010)
- Gusiluo, Tibetan religious leader of Buddhism (b. 997)
- Llywelyn Aurdorchog, Welsh nobleman (approximate date)
- Thorfinn (the Mighty), Norse nobleman (approximate date)
