= Gunthertuch =

Byzantine silk tapestry

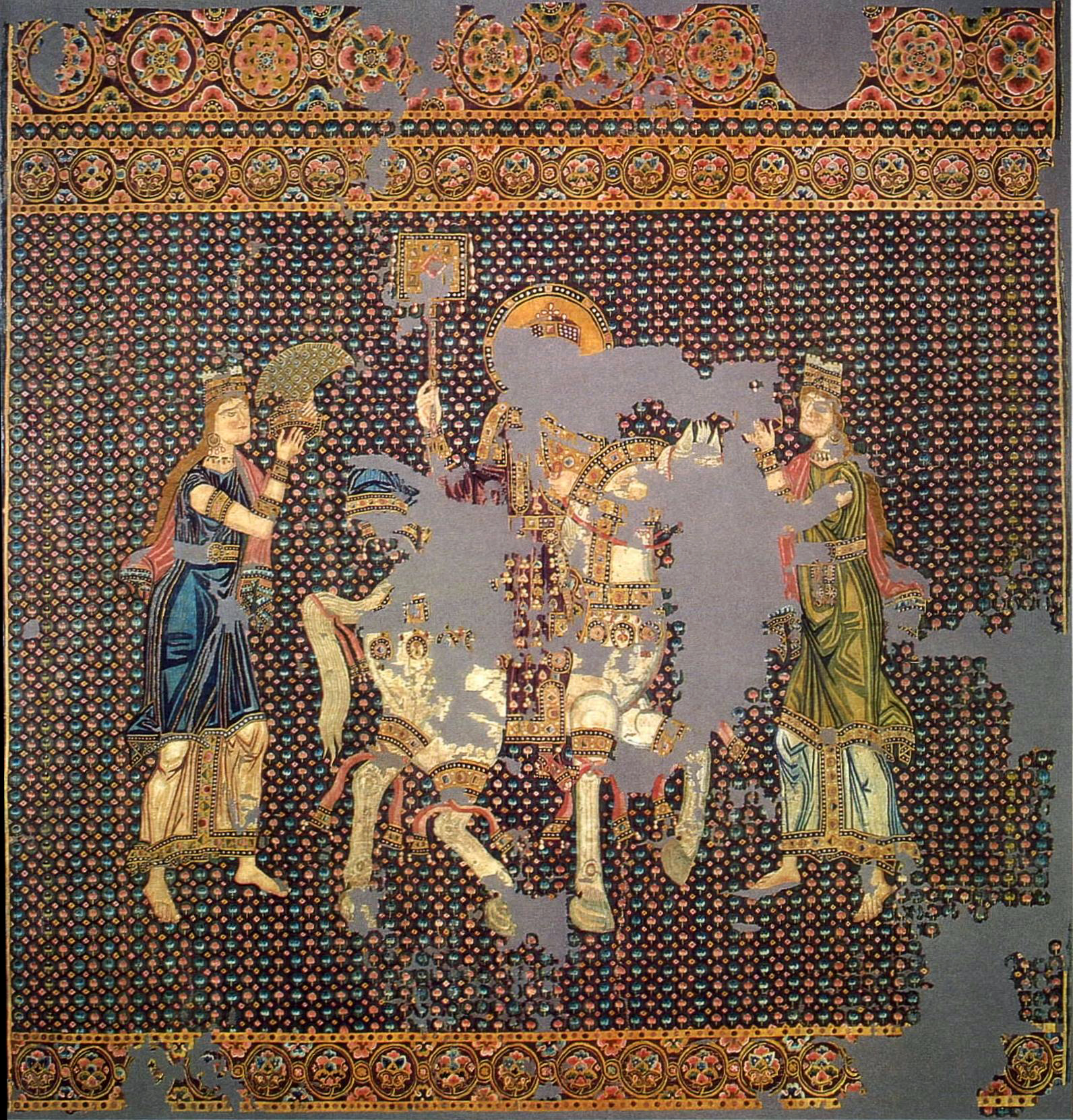
The Gunthertuch, Diocesan Museum, Bamberg

The Gunthertuch (lit. 'Gunther’s shroud') is a Byzantine silk tapestry which represents the triumphal return of a Byzantine Emperor from a victorious campaign. The piece was purchased, or possibly received as a gift, by Gunther von Bamberg, Bishop of Bamberg, during his 1064–65 pilgrimage to the Holy Land. Gunther died on his return journey, and was buried with it in the Bamberg Cathedral. The fabric was rediscovered in 1830, and is now exhibited in the Bamberg Diocesan Museum.

== History ==
In November 1064, Gunther took part in the so-called "Great German Pilgrimage" to Jerusalem, under the leadership of the archbishop of Mainz, Siegfried I; the bishop of Utrecht, William I; and the bishop of Regensburg, Otto von Riedenburg. The pilgrims, numbering some 7,000 people, journeyed through Hungary and then through the Byzantine Empire to the Holy Land.

At Constantinople, the Byzantine capital, Gunther's imposing stature and his elegant clothes led to the belief that he was the emperor Henry IV, travelling incognito. It is unknown how Gunther came by the silk. The Byzantinist Günter Prinzing theorized that the cloth was actually used as a wall tapestry in the Hagia Sophia. Gunther von Bamberg died on 23 July 1065 during his return journey at Székesfehérvár due to a severe illness. The other pilgrims brought his body home to Bamberg, wrapped in the cloth. There he was buried until rediscovered on 22 December 1830, when Gunther's grave was opened as part of extensive restoration works on the cathedral. Today, the Gunthertuch is exhibited alongside 11th-century imperial robes, the regalia and vestments of Pope Clement II and other items in the Diocesan Museum of Bamberg (Diözesanmuseum Bamberg).

== Description ==
The cloth is woven using the tapestry technique. It is 218 cm high and 211 cm wide, showing a Byzantine emperor on a patterned background. He is riding on a white horse, wears a Byzantine-style imperial crown, and carries a miniature labarum on his right hand. The emperor is flanked by two Tyche figures, female personifications of a city's fortune. They are crowned with mural crowns and dressed in ankle-long yellow undergarments and coloured transparent over-tunics. The Tyche on the right, with a green over-tunic, presents the emperor probably with a crown, while the left one, dressed in blue, holds the toupha, a headgear reserved exclusively for triumphs. Both figures are represented barefoot, a symbolic convention typical of slaves, signifying their submission to the emperor, or to represent their divinity as the goddess of fortune.

== Interpretation ==
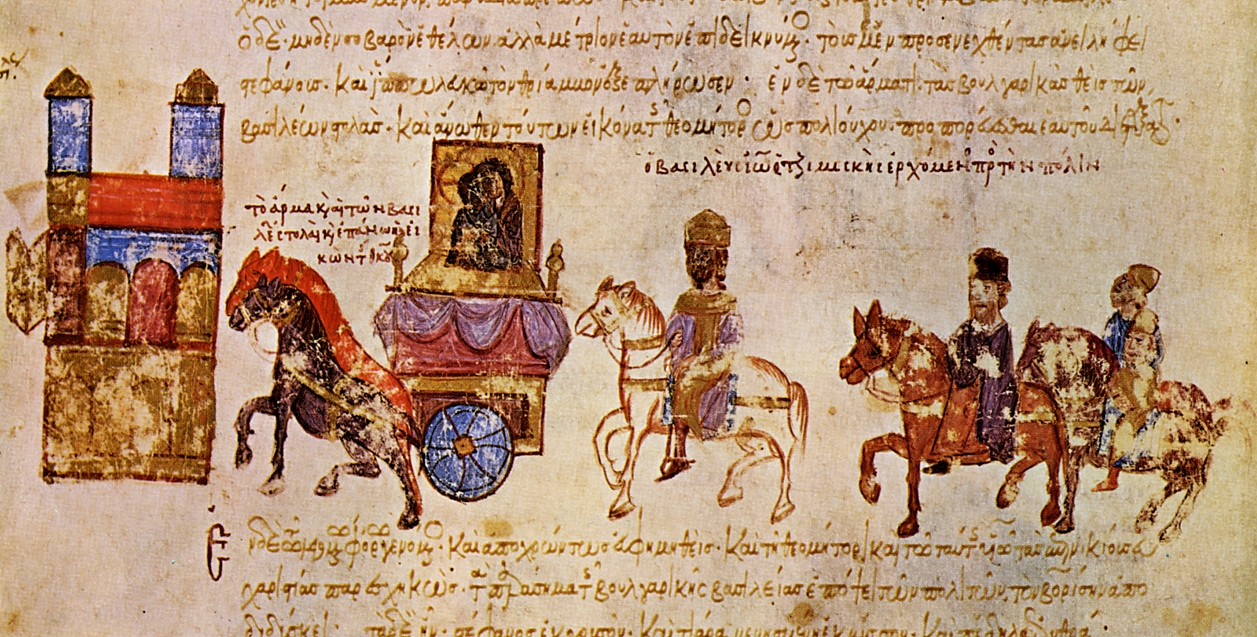
The triumphal return of John Tzimiskes to Constantinople in 971, as depicted in the Madrid Skylitzes. A carriage with the icon of the Virgin Mary precedes the emperor, who is followed by the captive Bulgarian tsar Boris II.

The emperor was initially identified, by the French Byzantinist André Grabar, with Basil II (r. 976–1025), and his triumphal return from his wars against the Bulgarians. Modern research however has concluded that the cloth represents John I Tzimiskes (r. 969–976) and his return in 971 from his campaign against the Rus', who had invaded and occupied Bulgaria.

According to the contemporary historian Leo the Deacon, during his triumphal procession Tzimiskes rode on a white horse behind a wagon carrying an icon of the Virgin Mary as well as the Bulgarian regalia, with the captive Boris II of Bulgaria and his family following behind Tzimiskes. The later account of John Skylitzes differs in some details in the description of the procession, but both sources agree that on this occasion, Tzimiskes rode a white horse, and that two Bulgarian crowns played an important role in the proceedings. Both authors also agree that one of these crowns was a tiara (i.e. the toupha), in accordance with the Gunthertuch’s depiction.

Older sources interpreted the two Tychae as representing Rome and Constantinople ("New Rome"), or even Athens and Constantinople, the two cities where Basil II celebrated his victory over the Bulgarians. A different proposal suggested, based on the colour of their clothes, that they represented the Blues and the Greens, the two traditional demoi (circus parties) of Constantinople. Modern scholarship on the other hand suggests that they may represent the two major cities captured during Tzimiskes' campaign, Preslav and Dorostolon. It is significant in this context that these two cities were renamed Ioannoupolis (after the emperor) and Theodoroupolis (after St. Theodore the Stratelate, who was believed to have intervened in the final battle against the Rus' before Dorostolon).
