= Feather headdress =

Feather headdress may refer to:

- War bonnet (Plains Indians)
- Montezuma's headdress (Mexico)
- Mahiole (Hawaii)
- Toupha (Byzantium)

== See also ==
- Featherwork
