= Ezzo =

Ezzo, also Etzo, Ezo, Hetzo, Hezzo or Hezo, is the medieval shortened form of various first names that start with E or He. The diminutive form is Ezzilo (Essilo, Etzilo, Ezilo, Hessilo, Hezzilo, Hetzilo, Hezilo). The shortening of the first names Ehrenfried, Ehrenfeld, Hermann and Heinrich is thereby documented.

Historical name bearers are:

- Ezzo or Ehrenfeld/Erenfried (died before 10 July 963), Count in Bonngau and Keldachgau, father of Herman I, Count Palatine of Lotharingia (ca. 929–996). The latter is the father of:
  - Hezzelin I, also Hezelo (Heinrich, married a daughter of Conrad I, Duke of Carinthia), was Vogt of Kornelimünster
  - Ezzo, Count Palatine of Lotharingia, Count in Zülpichgau (born ca. 955 in the Rhineland; died 5 December 1034)
- Henry of Schweinfurt (Hezilo), Count of Schweinfurt (died 1017), Count and Margrave of Nordgau, oldest son of Count Berthold I of Schweinfurt and of Eilika of Walbeck.
- Ezzo (poet) (died ca. 1100), middle high German religious poet in Bamberg.
- Ezelin I, Count of Ortenburg-Altortenburg (died 17 May 1446).
