= Hasungen Abbey =

Benedictine monastery in Germany

Coordinates: 51°19′26″N 9°16′38″E

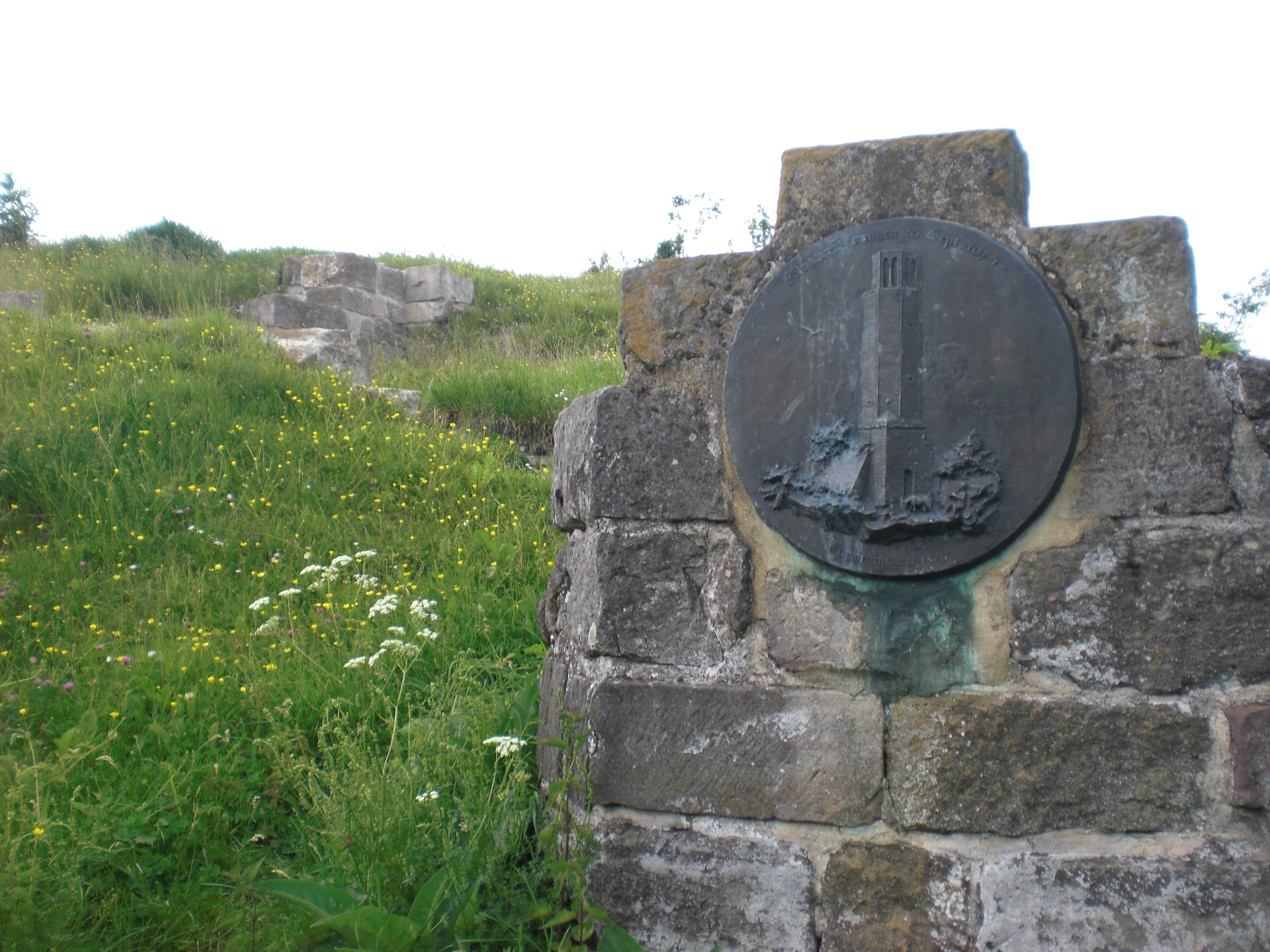
Ruins on the top of the mountain

Hasungen Abbey (German: Kloster Hasungen) was a monastery of the Benedictine Order located at Burghasungen, now a part of Zierenberg in Hesse in Germany.

The site is at the top of a 480-metre-high (1,570 ft) basalt mountain, the Hasunger Berg. In 1074 a monastery was built, on the authority of Siegfried I, Archbishop of Mainz, over the grave of the hermit Heimerad (d. 1019), who had a little chapel and hermitage here.

The historian Lambert of Hersfeld (d. circa 1088) was possibly abbot of Hasungen towards the end of his life.

The monastery existed until the Reformation, introduced in Hesse in 1527 by Philipp I of Hesse. Until then the abbey had been a centre of pilgrimage because of Heimerad, commonly venerated as a saint.

After the Reformation the buildings fell into ruins, except for the tower of the abbey church, which however in 1876 a bolt of lightning struck and destroyed. Now only a few stones remain.

== Burials ==
- Heimerad
- Siegfried I (Archbishop of Mainz)
