= Toupha =

Plumage worn as an ornamental crest or head-dress

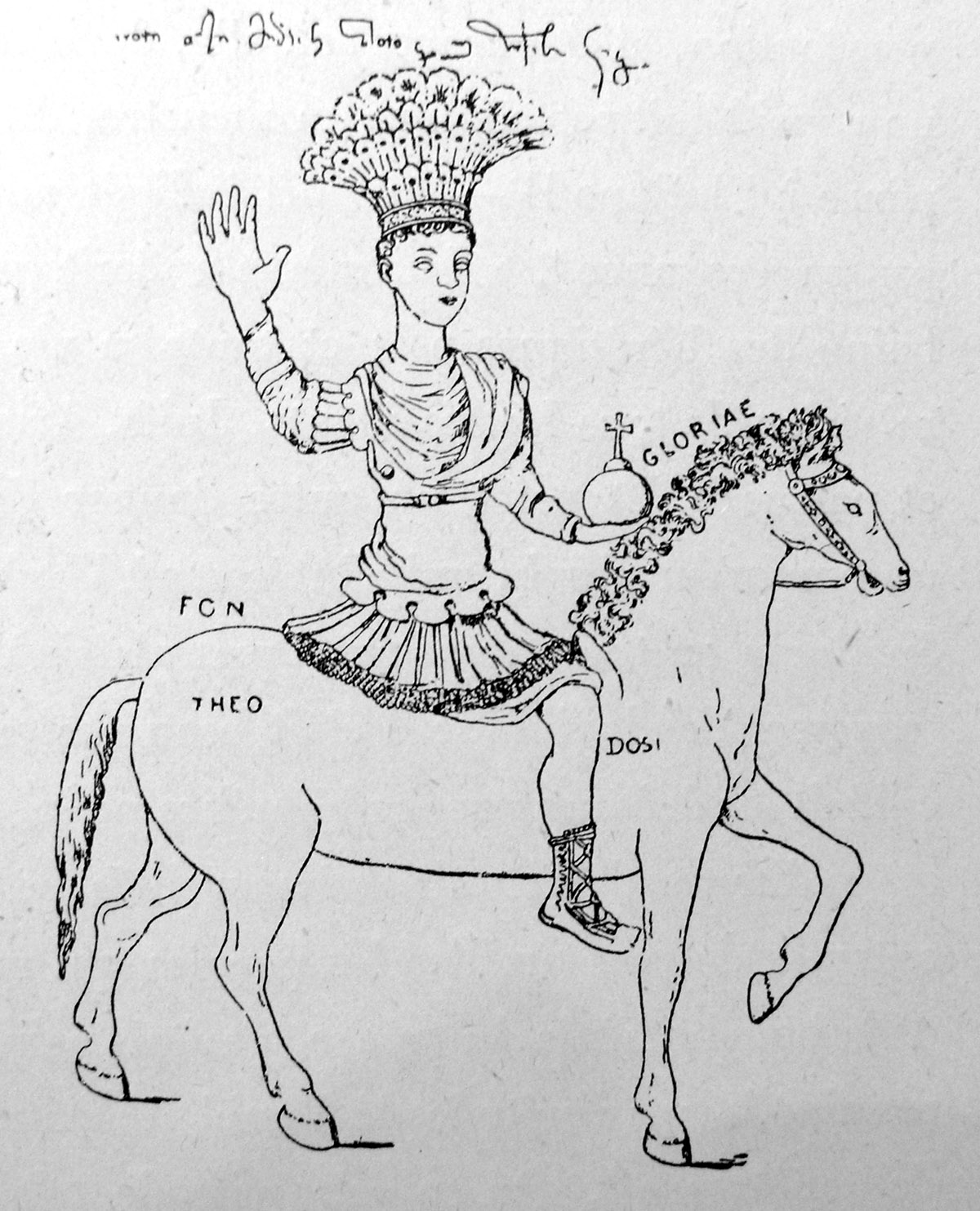
The equestrian statue of Justinian from the Augustaion, wearing a toupha.

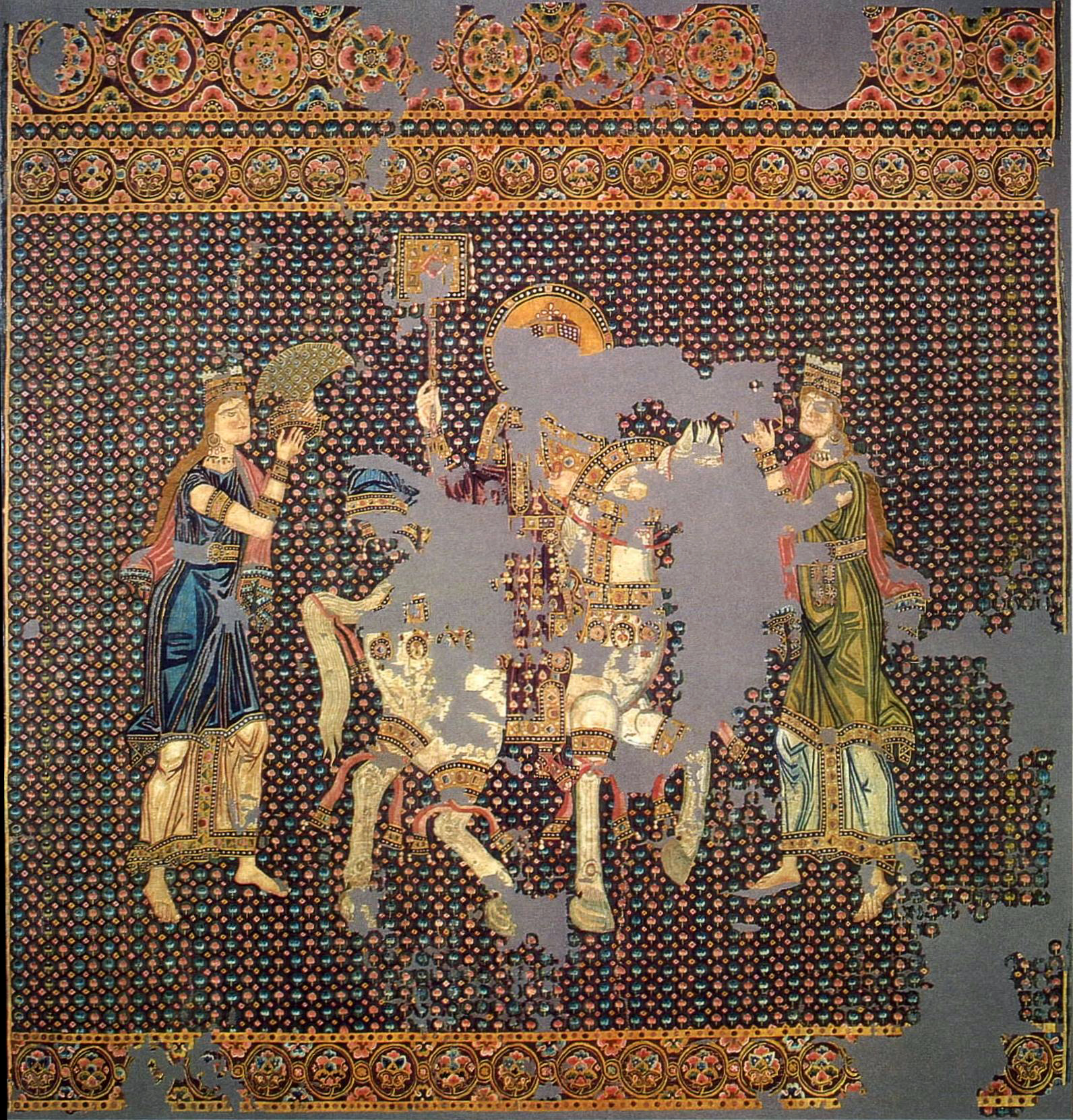
The "Bamberger Gunthertuch", a Byzantine silk tapestry depicting an emperor on his triumphant return from a campaign. The tyche on the left offers a toupha.

The toupha or toufa (τοῦφα, toûpha or τουφίον, touphíon) is a kind of ornamental crest or head-dress with a plumage of the feathers, hair or bristles of exotic animals, worn in classical antiquity as a triumphal decoration. In surviving depictions, it is most often seen on military helmets and emperors' crowns.

One of the most famous touphas is that which surmounted the crown or helmet of the bronze equestrian statue of the emperor Justinian I atop the column of Justinian, erected by said emperor, which stood in the Augustaion square of Constantinople. The toupha was made of gilded bronze, with a design of peacock-feathers. It is known primarily from a life-drawing of the statue made in the 15th century; the entire monument was later demolished. Particularly imposing in size, the head-dress fell from the statue in the 9th century and was remounted by an acrobat. A rope was stretched between the roof of Hagia Sophia and the summit of the column, by means of an arrow. Along this line, one could tightrope-walk to the statue. The notable aristocrat Theophilos Palaiologos rewarded the tightrope-walker with 100 gold nomismata for this exploit.

In colloquial language, toupha or typha came to mean a "tiara", and the 12th-century historian, Joannes Zonaras, even records that a verb, typhoomai ("to be filled with extreme arrogance"), was derived from it.

== See also ==
- Media related to Toupha at Wikimedia Commons
- War bonnet

== Bibliography ==
- Boeck, Elena. The Bronze Horseman of Justinian in Constantinople. Cambridge: Cambridge University Press, 2021.
- Lehman, Phyllis Williams. "Theodosius of Justinian?: A Renaissance Drawing of a Byzantine Rider." In The Art Bulletin, vol. 41, no. 1 (1959): 39-57
- Toupha, vol. 3, page 2100, of Alexander Kazhdan (ed.), Oxford Dictionary of Byzantium, 3 vols., Oxford University Press, 1991 (ISBN 0195046528)
