= Heimerad =

Saint Heimerad
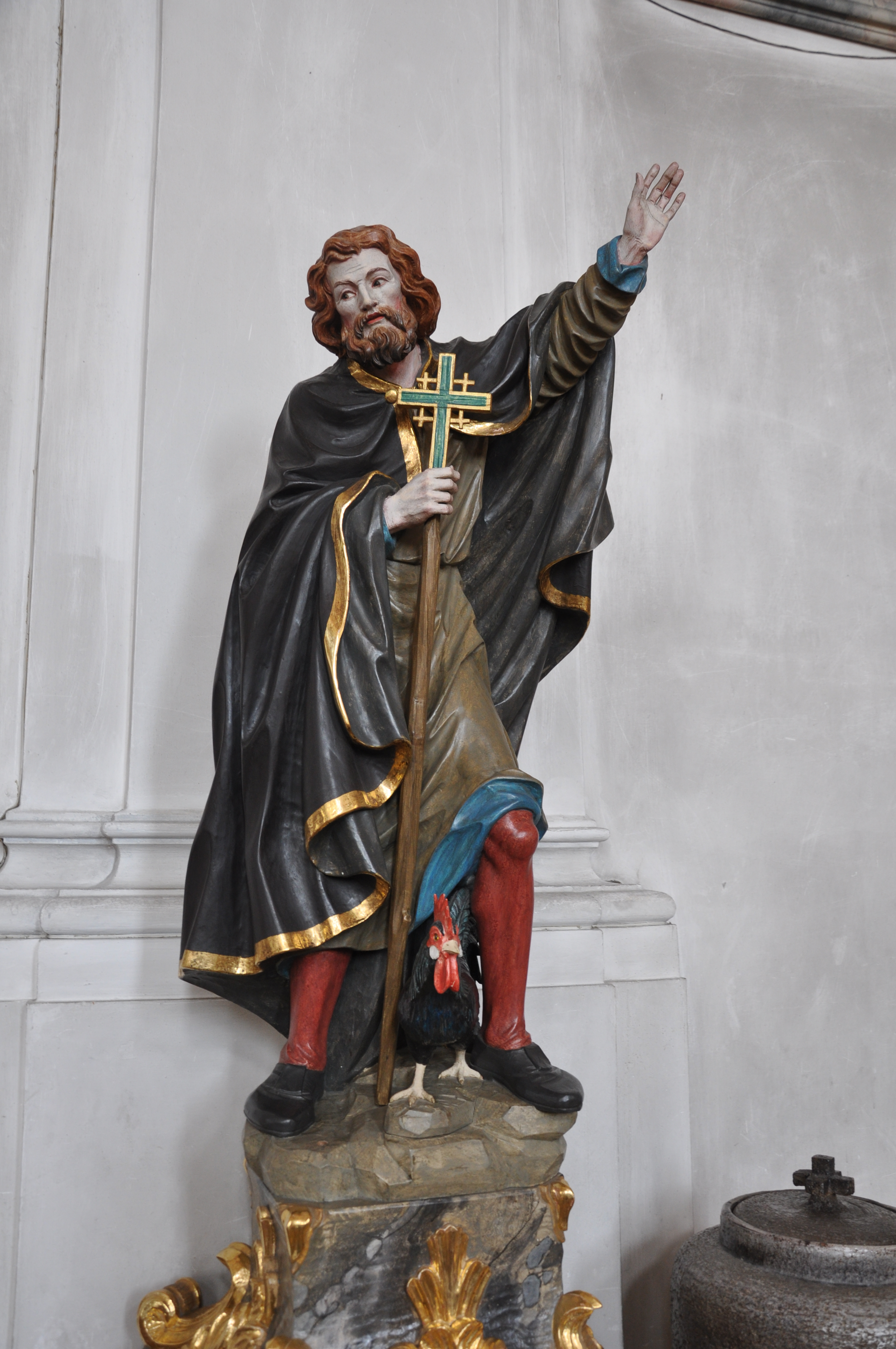

Venerable Fool for Christ
- Born: c. 970
- Died: 28 June 1019
- Honored in: Eastern Orthodox Church; Roman Catholic Church
- Feast: 28 June

Heimerad (also known as Heimrad, Haimrad or Heimo, c. 970 in Meßkirch near the Bodensee in Baden – 28 June 1019 on the Hasunger Berg (now Burghasungen) near Kassel) was a German priest and travelling preacher. He is venerated as a saint in the Eastern Orthodox Church and Roman Catholic Church, with the title of Fool for Christ. His feast day is on 28 June.

== Life ==
Born of unfree parents, Heimerad undertook pilgrimages in Germany, Italy and Palestine. After his return to Germany he became a monk in Hersfeld Abbey, but was expelled after a dispute about wearing the order's clothing. Nor was he accepted in the monastery at Paderborn. Because of his conspicuous and unusual way of life he was driven from several places, and became more and more desolate. At length he found a site for a hermitage on the Hasunger Berg (today Burghasungen in Zierenberg). At first mocked and scorned even there, with the passage of time he came to be revered as a saint and his advice was sought by the great: he was acquainted with the Empress Kunigunde, Bishop Meinwerk of Paderborn and Aribo, Archbishop of Mainz. He died in 1019, on 28 June, which is now his feast day.

The main source for his life is the biography written by the monk Ekkebert of Hersfeld between 1072 and 1090.

Aribo, Archbishop of Mainz, had a church built over Heimerad's grave on the Hasunger Berg two years after his death, in 1021, which served as the nucleus of Hasungen Abbey, founded in 1074. Pilgrimages to his grave reached their high point in the second half of the 11th century, when Hasungen ranked as the most visited place of pilgrimage in Germany next to the grave of Sebaldus in Nuremberg. In later centuries, especially after the dissolution of Hasungen Abbey in the 16th century, veneration of Heimerad tailed off drastically.
