= Smuggling of silkworm eggs into the East Roman Empire =

In the mid-6th century CE during the time of the Silk Road, two monks – with the support of the Eastern Roman emperor Justinian I – acquired and smuggled living silkworms into the Eastern Roman Empire or Byzantine Empire, which led to the establishment of an indigenous Eastern Roman silk industry that long held a silk monopoly in Europe.

== Background ==
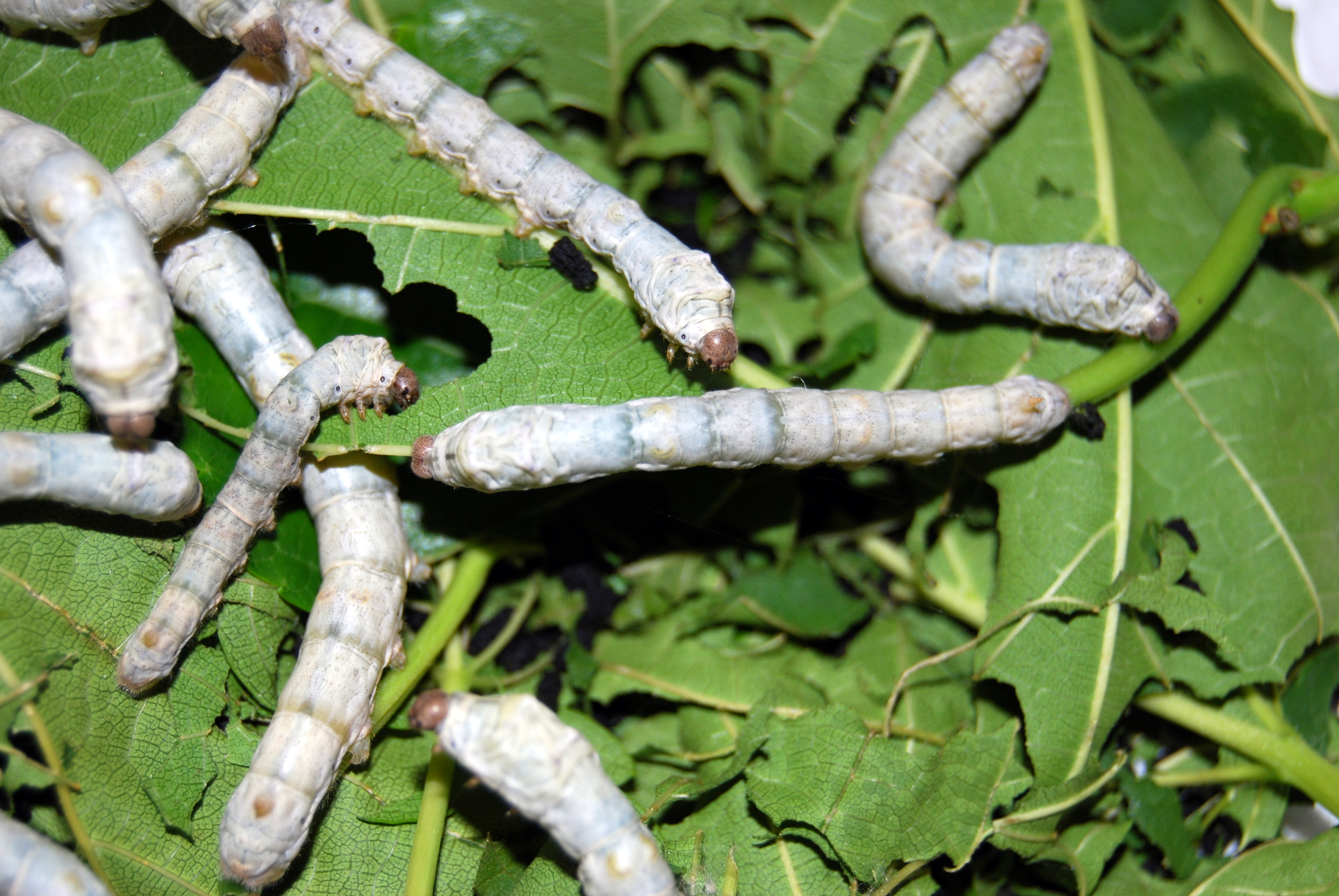
Silkworms

Silk was first produced sometime during the third millennium BCE by the Chinese. By the first century CE, there was a steady flow of silk into the Roman Empire. With the rise of the Sassanid Empire and the subsequent Roman–Persian Wars, importing silk to Europe became increasingly difficult and expensive. The Persians strictly controlled trade in their territory and would suspend trade in times of war. Consequently, the Eastern Roman Emperor Justinian I tried creating alternative trade routes to Sogdiana, which at the time had become a major silk-producing centre: one to the north via Crimea, and one to the south via Ethiopia. However, Aksumite traders from Ethiopia were unable to compete with Persian traders due to the closer proximity of Persia to India. Additionally, the route from Lazica to China was long and dangerous, and Justinian was unable to make much progress on this route. The lack of success in these efforts led Justinian I to look elsewhere since demand for this luxury good was high, even within his inner circle.

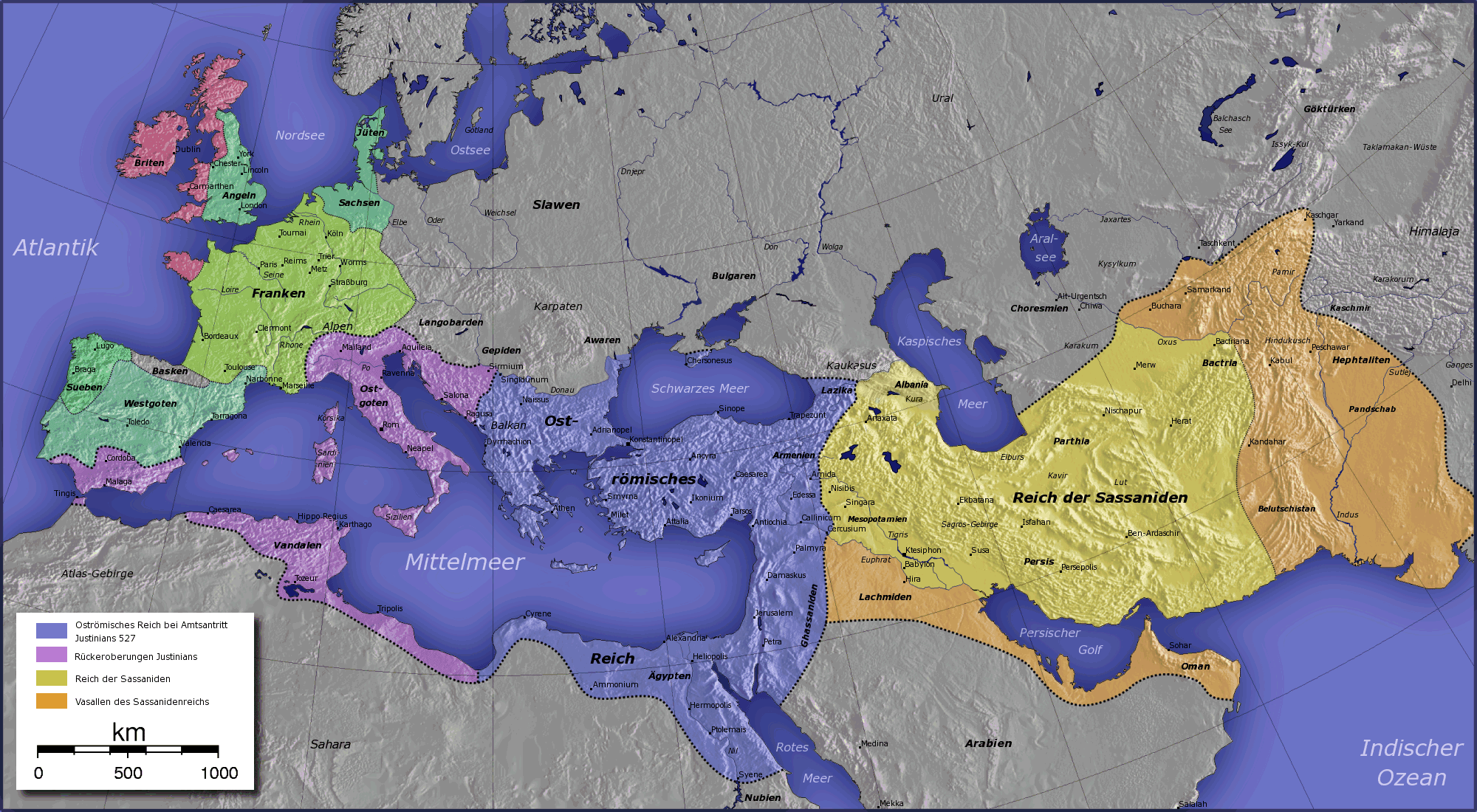
565AD. Eastern Roman Empire, blue and purple; Sassanid Empire in yellow. Sassanid vassals, in orange, encompassing the Persian Gulf to the south, and reaching the Indus River in the southeast and the Kingdom of Khotan in the northeast (both silk-growing areas).

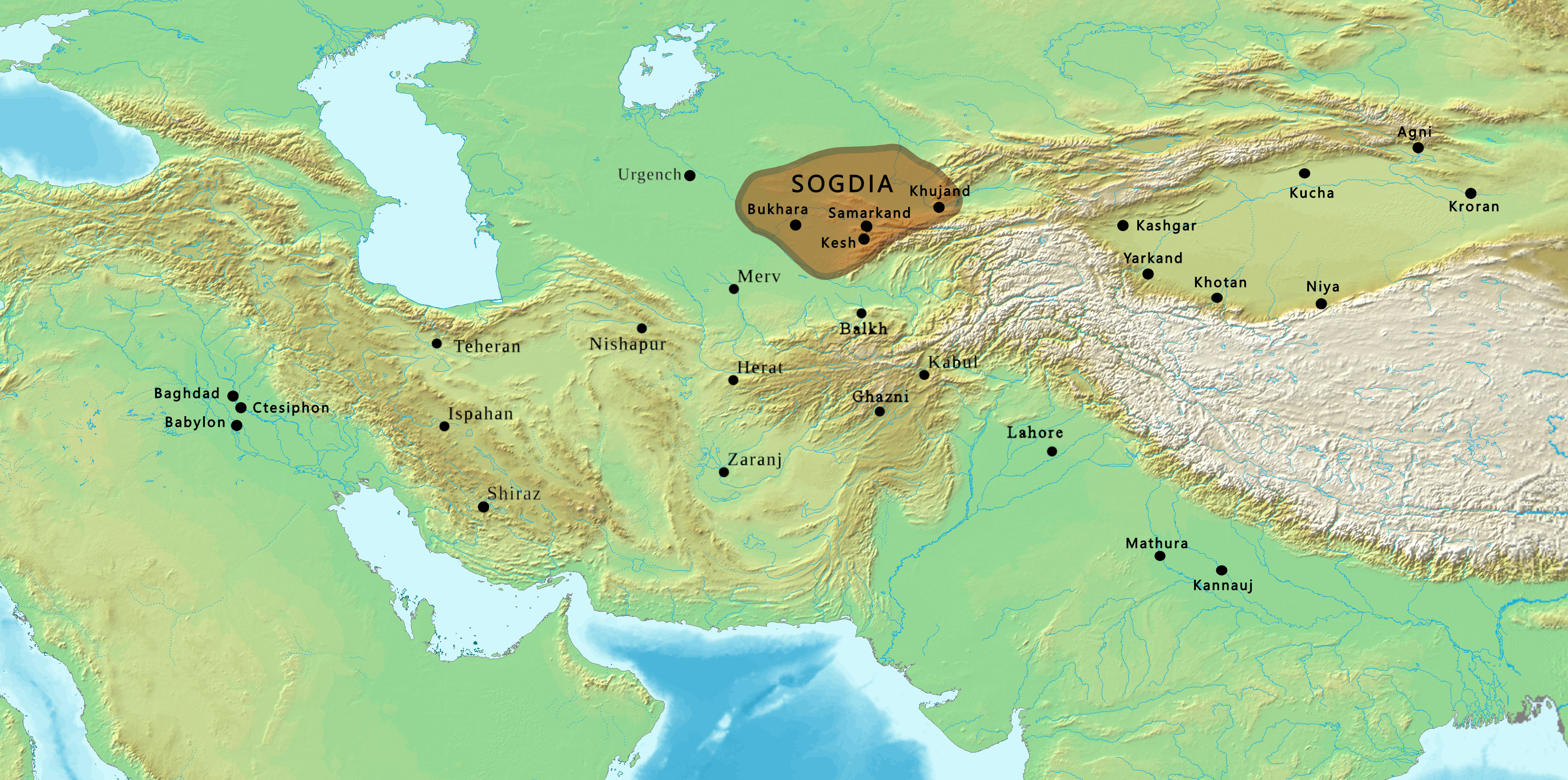
Sogdiana, located in Central Asia north of the Sassanid states. Silk was also produced in the Kingdom of Khotan (east of Sogdiana) at this time, and in the Indian subcontinent, east of the Sassanid Empire

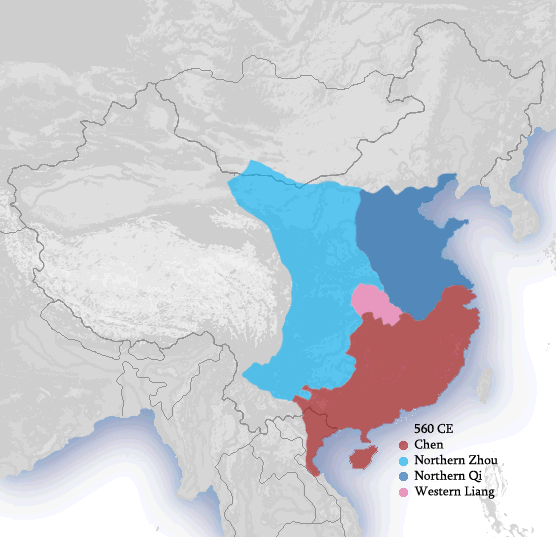
Silk production also occurred in these areas of East Asia in 560AD, in the Northern and Southern dynasties or Six Dynasties period

== Expedition ==
Two unidentified monks (most likely members of the Nestorian Church) who had been preaching Christianity in India (Church of the East in India), made their way to China by 551 CE. While they were in China, they observed the intricate methods for raising silkworms and producing silk. This was a key development, as the Eastern Romans had previously thought silk was made in India. In 552 CE, the two monks sought out Justinian I. In return for his generous but unknown promises, the monks agreed to acquire silkworms from China. They most likely traveled a northern route along the Black Sea, taking them through the Transcaucasus and the Caspian Sea.

Since adult silkworms are rather fragile and have to be constantly kept at an ideal temperature, lest they perish, they used their contacts in Sogdiana to smuggle out silkworm eggs or very young larvae instead, which they hid within their bamboo canes. Mulberry bushes, which are required for silkworms, were either given to the monks or already imported into the Eastern Roman Empire. All in all, it is estimated that the entire expedition lasted two years.

== Impact ==
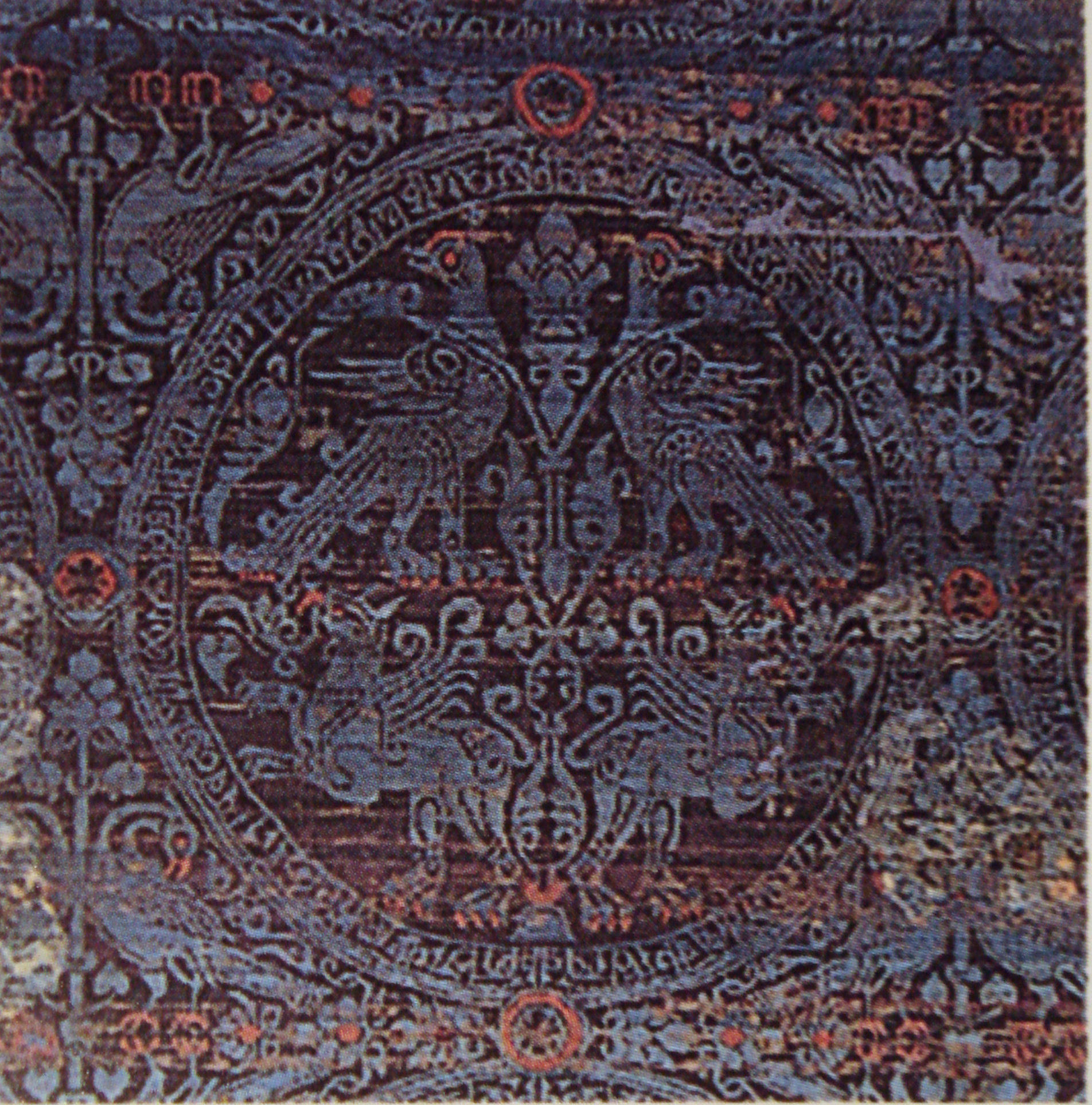
Byzantine silk

Shortly after the expedition there were silk factories in Constantinople, Beirut, Antioch, Tyre, and Thebes. The acquired silkworms allowed the Eastern Roman Empire to have a silk monopoly in Europe. The acquisition also broke the Chinese and Persian silk monopolies. The resulting monopoly was a foundation for the Eastern Roman economy for the next 650 years until its demise in 1204. Silk clothes, especially those dyed in imperial purple, were almost always reserved for the elite in Byzantium, and their wearing was codified in sumptuary laws. Silk production in the region around Constantinople, particularly in Thrace in northern Greece, has continued to the present (see: Silk museums of Soufli).
