= Byzantine silk =

Silk woven in or distributed via the Byzantine Empire

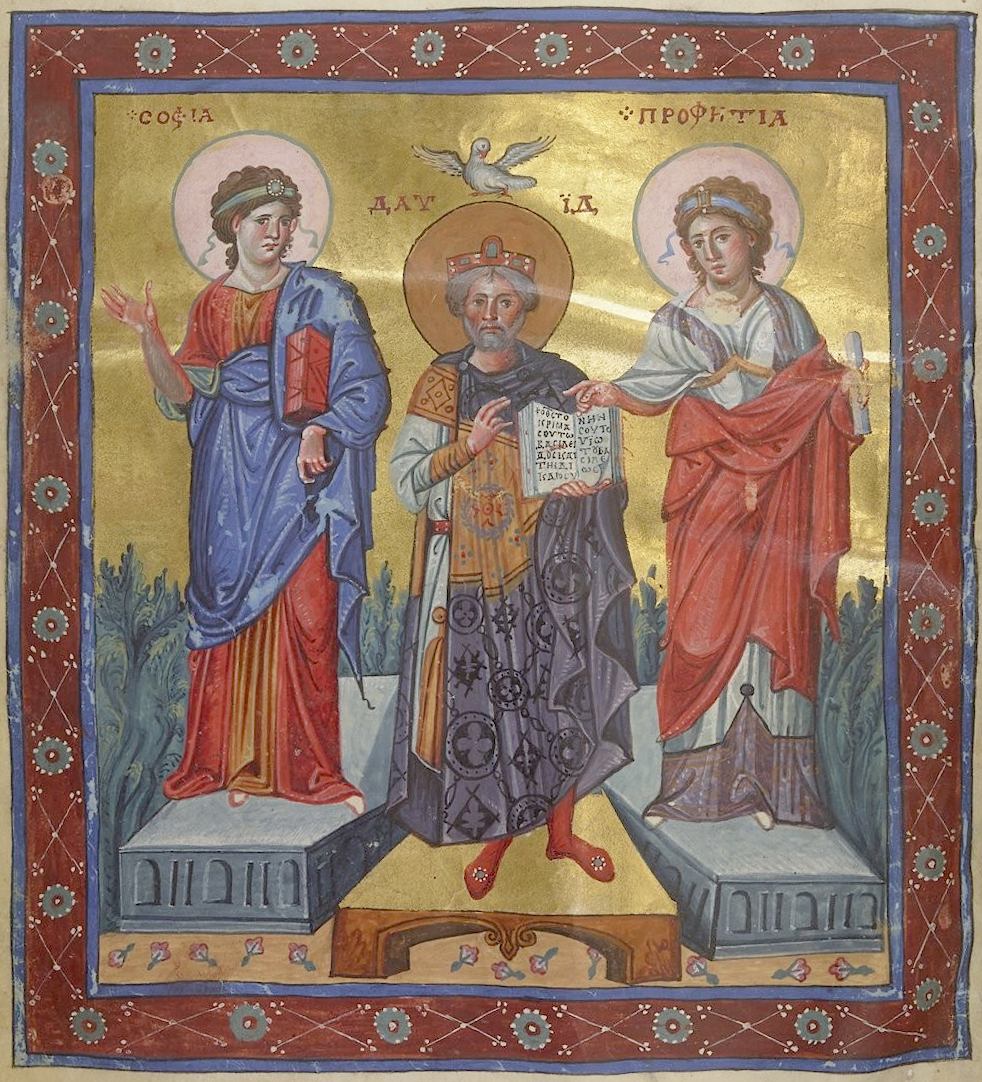
David, between personifications of Wisdom and Prophecy, is depicted in a chlamys of patterned Byzantine silk. Paris Psalter, 10th century.

Byzantine silk is silk woven in the Byzantine Empire (Byzantium) from about the fourth century until the Fall of Constantinople in 1453.

The Byzantine capital of Constantinople was the first significant silk-weaving center in Europe. Silk was one of the most important commodities in the Byzantine economy, used by the state both as a means of payment and of diplomacy.

Raw silk was bought from China and made up into fine fabrics that commanded high prices throughout the world. Later, silkworms were smuggled into the Empire and the overland silk trade gradually became less important. After the reign of Justinian I, the manufacture and sale of silk became an imperial monopoly, only processed in imperial factories, and sold to authorized buyers.

Byzantine silks are significant for their brilliant colours, use of gold thread, and intricate designs that approach the pictorial complexity of embroidery in loom-woven fabric. Byzantium dominated silk production in Europe throughout the Early Middle Ages, until the establishment of the Italian silk-weaving industry in the 12th century and the conquest and break-up of the Byzantine Empire in the Fourth Crusade (1204).

== Development ==
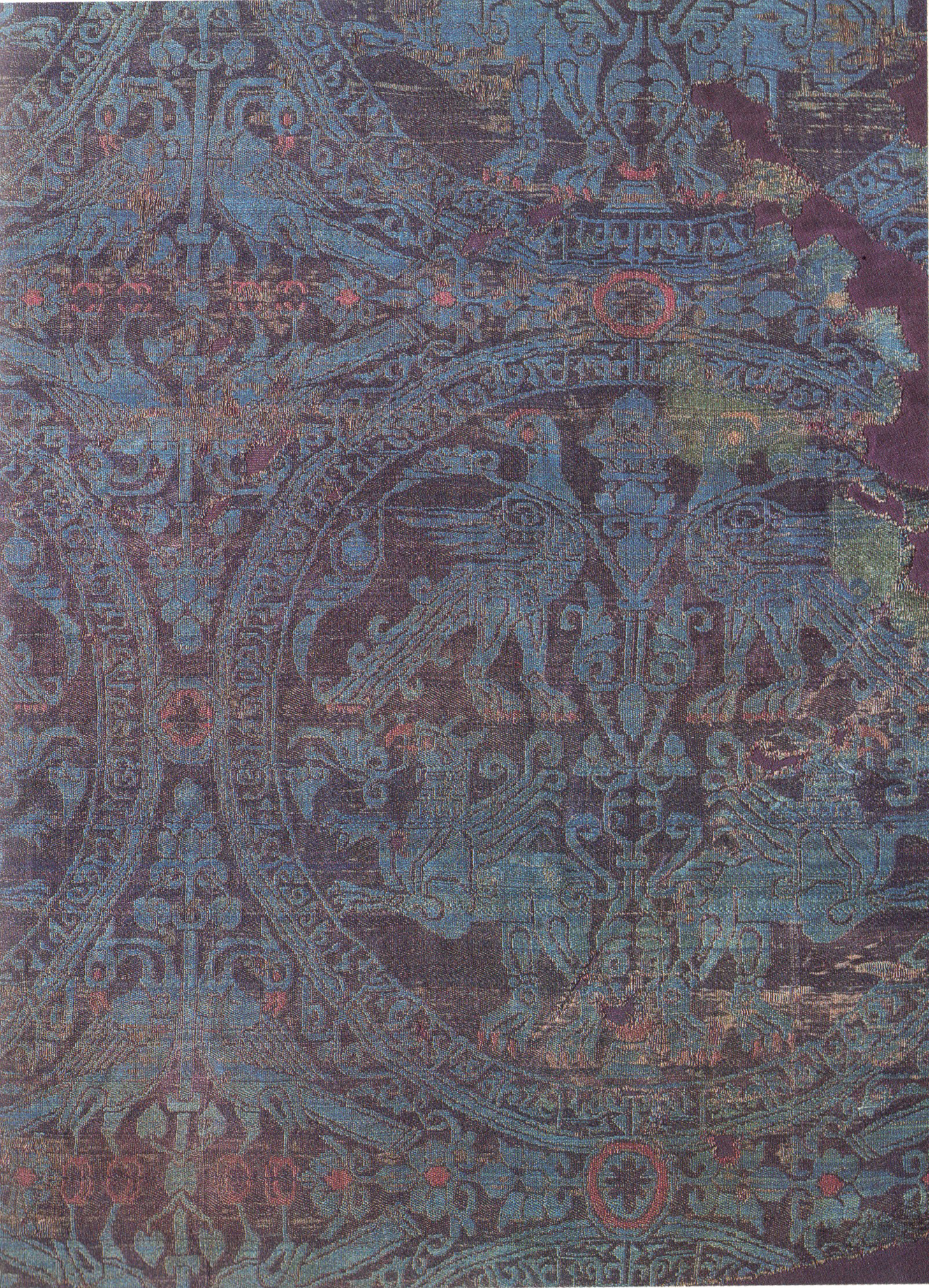
Byzantine silk with a pattern of birds and griffins in roundels.

In the time of the Roman Empire, silk textiles reached the West overland via the Silk Road across Asia from Han China, passing through the Parthian Empire and later Sassanid Empire to trading centers in Syria. Imports of raw silk, silk yarn, and finished fabrics are all recorded, but the techniques of producing these textiles from the silkworm Bombyx mori remained a closely guarded secret of the Chinese until the Emperor of the East Justinian I (482–565) arranged to have silkworm eggs smuggled out of Central Asia in 553–54, setting the stage for the flowering of the Byzantine silk-weaving industry.

The trade of the silk caterpillars and cocoons started off with households having an industry within their homes for silk making. The households tended to be on the outskirts of a town or in rural areas. The capital is where the main production of silk goods was done, and so the silk materials would have to be transported via land or sea and given from merchant to merchant in order to make it to the capital to be made into goods. However, this method was risky economically, as there were many factors that people had to consider in order to proceed. The mode of transportation, capacity utilization, the distance needing to be traveled, charges for carrying silk cocoons, and the quality expectations were all variables in the economic feasibility of silk and its production.

New types of looms and weaving techniques also played a part. Plain-woven or tabby silks had circulated in the Roman world, and patterned damask silks in increasingly complex geometric designs appear from the mid-3rd century. Weft-faced compound twills were developed not later than 600, and polychrome (multicolored) compound twills became the standard weave for Byzantine silks for the next several centuries. Monochrome lampas weaves became fashionable around 1000 in both Byzantine and Islamic weaving centres; these fabrics rely on contrasting textures rather than color to render patterns. A small number of tapestry-woven Byzantine silks also survive.

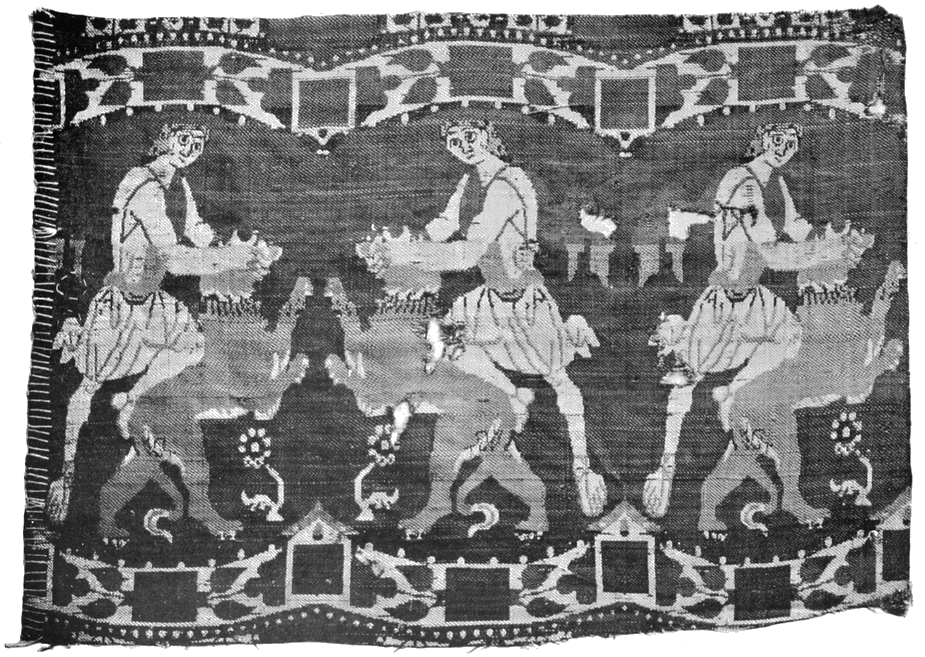
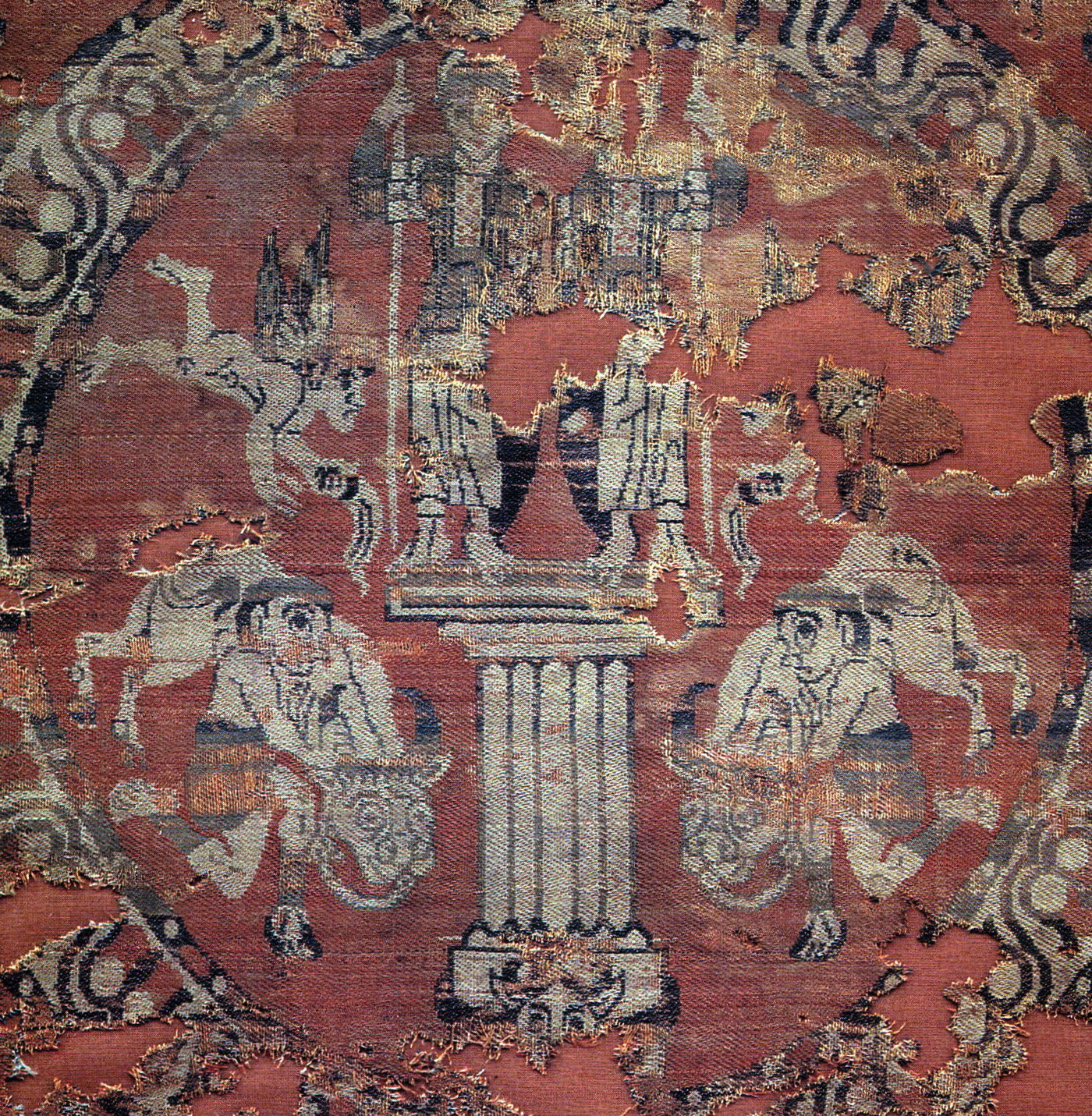
Left image: Byzantine silk textile showing a scene of Saint Sampson the Hospitable, 6th-7th century
Right image: Silk cloth with image of an offering of animals brought to two figures (Castor and Pollux) standing on a pillar; Byzantium, 7th/8th century

Figured (patterned) Byzantine silks of the 6th (and possibly 5th) centuries show overall designs of small motifs such as hearts, and leaves worked in two weft colours. Later, recognizable plant motifs (such as lotus leaves and flowers) and human figures appear. Surviving textiles document a rich exchange of techniques and iconographic themes between Constantinople and the newly-Islamic textile centres of the Mediterranean and Central Asia in the years after the Muslim conquests of the 7th century. Designs of the 8th and 9th centuries show rows of roundels or medallions populated with pairs of human or animal figures reversed in mirror-image on a vertical axis. Many motifs echo Sassanian designs including the tree of life, winged horses, lions, and imaginary beasts, and there are numbers of surviving pieces where specialists cannot agree between a Byzantine or Islamic origin. Fashionable patterns evoked the activities and interests of the royal court, such as hunting scenes or the quadriga (four-horse chariot).

== International relations ==
8th-century embroidered fragment, 16 x 15 cm

=== Political alliances ===
Silk diplomacy was also utilized to maintain political and trade diplomatic relationships with other nations, especially in Southern and Eastern Europe. Regions in the Latin West like Venice, Genoa, Pisa, and Amalfi would have silk utilized as a diplomatic gift and reward. In one particular instance, Venice protected the Byzantines from the Normans and the Crusaders and were rewarded with gold and silk for their efforts. Marriages would also be used to create political alliances, and silk was used to help arrange marriages. These were done by promising silk dispensaries as well, and were done with the Latin West a lot. One famous case was Emperor Constantine V marrying his eldest son Leo to Gisela, the daughter of the Latin ruler Pepin. This was done to help with negotiations with the betrothal in 765, and mosaic hunter silk was thrown in to improve the deal.

A lot of information on the exchange of silk prior to the eleventh century was found in the Vita Basilii, which written during the reign of Constantine VII. Silk producers would send gifts on behalf of their governments as a sign of peace. One silk producer was a slave named Danelina, who sent gifts to Emperor Basil I in 880. Among these gifts were 100 female weavers and precious textiles.

=== China ===
Shortly after the smuggling of silkworm eggs from China by Nestorian Christian monks, the 6th-century Byzantine historian Menander Protector writes of how the Sogdians attempted to establish a direct trade of Chinese silk with the Byzantine Empire. After forming an alliance with the Sasanian ruler Khosrow I to defeat the Hephthalite Empire, Istämi, the Göktürk ruler of the Turkic Khaganate, was approached by Sogdian merchants requesting permission to seek an audience with the Sassanid king of kings for the privilege of traveling through Persian territories in order to trade with the Byzantines. Istämi refused the first request, but when he sanctioned the second one and had the Sogdian embassy sent to the Sassanid king, the latter had the members of the embassy poisoned to death.

Maniah, a Sogdian diplomat, convinced Istämi to send an embassy directly to Constantinople, which arrived in 568 and offered not only silk as a gift to Byzantine ruler Justin II, but also proposed an alliance against Sassanid Persia. Justin II agreed and sent an embassy to the Turkic Khaganate, ensuring the direct silk trade desired by the Sogdians. However, even with the Byzantine production of silk starting in the 6th century, Chinese varieties were still considered of better quality, a fact that is perhaps underscored by the discovery of a Byzantine solidus coin minted during the reign of Justin II found in a Sui dynasty (581–618 AD) Chinese tomb of Shaanxi province in 1953, among other Byzantine coins found at various sites.

According to Chinese histories, the Byzantines (i.e. "Fu-lin"), maintaining an earlier Roman diplomatic tradition in China, also sent several embassies to the court of the Chinese Tang dynasty (618–907 AD) and on one occasion to that of the Song dynasty (960–1279), offering exotic gifts such as glasswares while demonstrating a continual interest in the Chinese silk trade. The 7th-century Byzantine historian Theophylact Simocatta provided a fairly accurate depiction of China, its geography, its reunification by the Sui dynasty (581–618), and even named its ruler Taisson as meaning "Son of God", perhaps also derived from the name Emperor Taizong of Tang (r. 626–649). Contemporary Chinese sources, namely the Old and New Book of Tang, also depicted the city of Constantinople and how it was besieged by Muawiyah I (founder of the Umayyad Caliphate), who exacted tribute afterwards.

=== Constantinople ===
Being the capital for the Byzantine Empire meant that much diplomacy was done and centered around Constantinople. Foreign dignitaries would stay within the city, and silk would be used to show gratitude towards other nations. For instance, when Emperor Manuel I was victorious over the Hungarians and Serbs in battle, he had numerous silk items on display in Constantinople and to be adorned by high ranking officials. This was shown off to the captured Hungarians and Serbs, who were also made to feel the silk. This was done to showcase the Byzantine's superiority over the defeated nations in the Byzantine's eyes.

=== Arab regions ===
Silk was used to perform trade and military treaties with Arabic regions and started at some point before the eleventh century. The Byzantines admired Arab silk textures and patterns greatly, and would try to have silk producers replicate them within the empire. Silk allowed for a cross-cultural exchange between Arabic Regions and the Byzantine Empire. Silk has also been mentioned in military treaties, such as in a peace treaty in 968 between Muslim governor of Aleppo, Qarghawaih (modern day Syria), and Emperor Nikephoros II. When Arab pirates attacked northern Peloponnese, one of the main reasons the Byzantines heavily defended it was due to luxury silk textiles being located there.

== Legislation ==
=== Imperial ===
Regulations governing the use of expensive Tyrian purple dyestuffs varied over the years, but cloth dyed in these colors was generally restricted to specific classes and was used in diplomatic gifts. Other dyes used in Byzantine silk workshops were madder, kermes, indigo, weld, and sappanwood. Gold thread was made with silver-gilt strips wrapped around a silk core.

These regulations were incited under imperial decrees, which led to an imperial monopoly over the usage of silk within the Byzantine Empire. The purple dyes in particular were monopolized. Due to the high costs and labor involved, the imperials were the only ones able to produce the purple silk as well. The Empire had a cooperative body called a collegia oversee the production of purple dyes with silk making. If one was found to be making unapproved silk productions with purple dyes, their product would be seized and would have to pay a fine. There would also be types of yard that would be forbidden to use with purple dyes based on the emperor's preference with it.

The decrees also resulted in Justinian Codes in how the silks were identified. Different silks could be used to determine one's status within the empire, their civil or military office status, and their social and economic status. The decrees also put regulations on the open market the silks were sold in, needing a government official or member of the clergy to give someone permission to sell their silk.

=== Non-imperial ===
In the 10th century, non-imperial guilds maintained some of the silk production in the Byzantine Empire, especially in Constantinople. There were regulations these guilds had to follow, which were documented in the Book of the Perfect. For example, purples and certain blues and reds could only be sold and produced for people in the imperial court or of a high social standing. There were also types of petticoats and garments reserved for these groups as well under this book.

== Religious presence ==
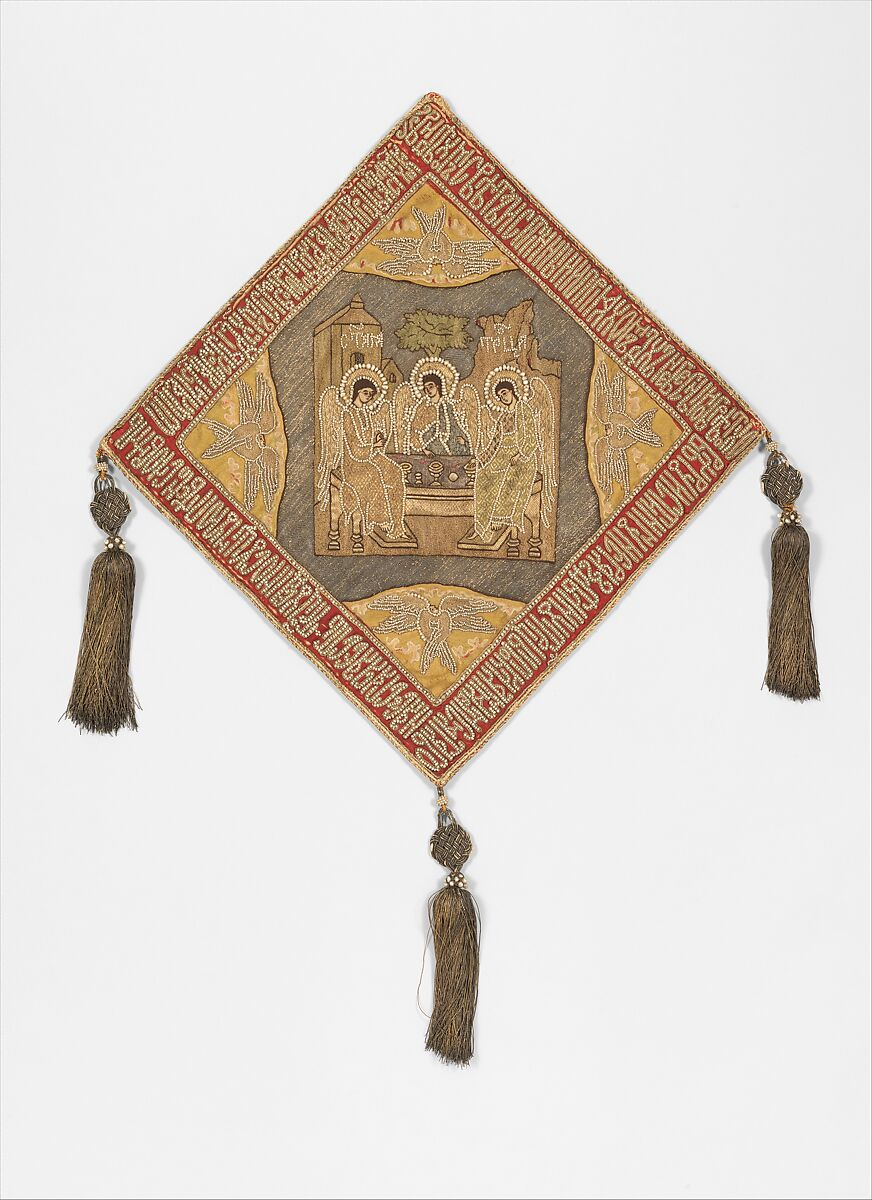
A epigonation a priest would have worn in church during the Byzantine Empire

Silks in the Byzantine Empire were given to the Church as gifts to show the Empire's dedication to the Church. Many churches received elegant silks, many embroidered with gold or gemstones. Altar cloth before the ninth century was composed mostly of pure gold and silken thread. The monastery of St. John at Patmos had a detailed inventory of silk given to them before the year 1200. Included in this inventory was silk cloths which covered instruments of the Eucharist, silk vestments, and silk icon covers. Liturgical practice also used silk cloth such as epigonation, epitaphios, and sakkos.

== Terms ==
=== Serika ===
Serika is a term used by many Byzantine historians such as Theophanes of Byzantium, Nikephoros, and Niketas Choniates. This term usually refers to a completed silk product. While typically silk was a luxury item, this term refers to silk products that would be available to the general public. The term is a vague description for silk products, and more specific terms would be needed for silk descriptions

=== Blattia ===
Blattia started as a term to describe silk goods that were dyed purple, usually from being mixed with shellfish. It became associated with generalized silk products around the 9th century. The term became more ambiguous, being referred to any silk product dyed purple. The products ranged from garments, furniture, and decorative tapestries.

=== Holoserika ===
Holoserika refers to a reward that sailors would receive for retrieving valuable goods, typically silk goods, while on a voyage. Generally, the rewards were generic silk goods. The term appeared in the 7th or 8th century in the Rhodian Sea Law.

=== Subsericum ===
Subsericum generally refers to silk that is badly spun. It doesn't relate to silk products, but rather the silk that is used to create products.

=== Holoblattia ===
Holoblattia refers to silk used in more important goods or the goods themselves. Some examples of this are ceremonial attire for church singers and ceremonial attire for imperial guards.

=== Metaxa ===
Metaxa refers to raw silk fiber. One of the first uses of this term was from Prokopios, who used it in his description of the introduction of sericulture to Byzantium. This term also was used in many descriptions describing trade with the Sogdians, showcasing that much trade was done with the raw silk fiber rather than completed silk goods. Occasionally this term could be referred to woven silk, but most of the time was referred to unwoven silk. This term is also found in references to military equipment, such as the material for the strings on bows.

=== Sendes ===
Sendes refers to silk fabric that was made in a way to imitate silk found in Arabic regions. Typically this would include the texture of the silk, as well as patterns that are on the finished product.

=== Triblattion ===
Triblattion refers to silk that is reserved for the emperor and his court. This kind is a type of clothing, which is usually bi-colored or tri-colored. Typically, there would be a dominant color and a ground color.

=== Diblattion ===
Diblattion also refers to silk products reserved for the emperor and his court. However, these silk goods are the cushions that they recline on. Each diblattion would be sewn and made differently based on your theme. Your theme was usually dictated by your role in the empire. For example, military leaders would be given a different dilattion based on their ranks.

== Woven textiles ==
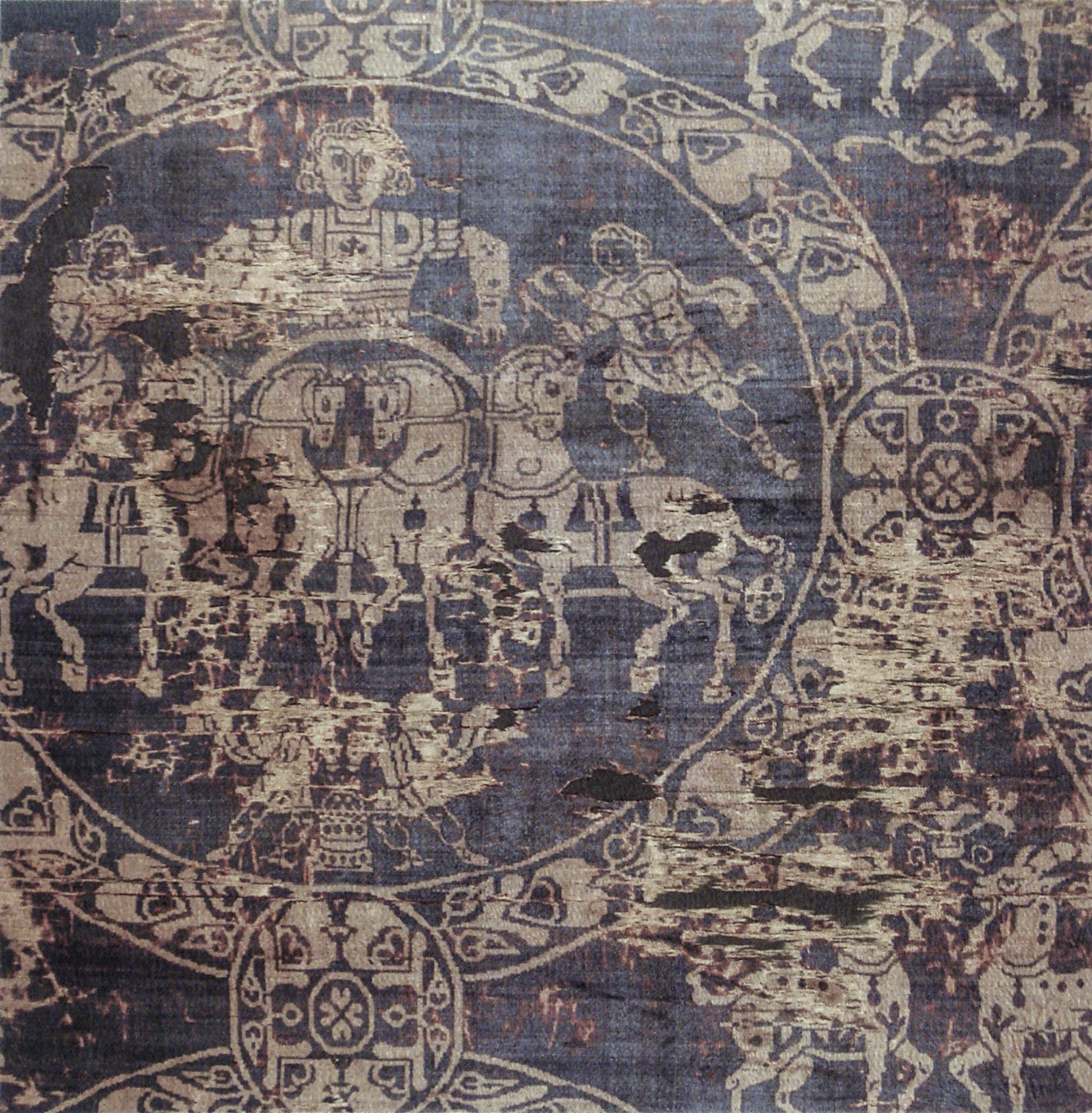
The Shroud of Charlemagne, a polychrome Byzantine silk with a pattern showing a quadriga, 9th century. Paris, musée national du Moyen Âge.

Of the five basic weaves used in Byzantium and the Islamic weaving centers of the Mediterranean – tabby, twill, damask, lampas and tapestry – the most important product was the weft-faced compound twill called samite. The word is derived from Old French samit, from medieval Latin samitum, examitum deriving from the Byzantine Greek ἑξάμιτον hexamiton "six threads", usually interpreted as indicating the use of six yarns in the warp. In samite, the main warp threads are hidden on both sides of the fabric by the ground and patterning wefts, with only the binding warps that hold the wefts in place visible.

These rich silks – literally worth their weight in gold – were powerful political weapons of the Byzantine Empire between the 4th and 12th centuries. Diplomatic gifts of Byzantine silks cemented alliances with the Franks. Byzantium granted silk-trading concessions to the sea powers of Venice, Pisa, Genoa and Amalfi to secure naval and military aid for Byzantine territories.

The influence exerted by Byzantine silk weaving was profound. Byzantine silk court ritual and ecclesiastical practices were adopted by the Franks, just as Byzantine court furnishing styles and dress codes were echoed across the Islamic world. Byzantium developed elaborate silk court attire and set the style for use of silk in civil and military uniforms and for rich religious vestments.... These silks served as a form of portable wealth that could be profitably disposed of in times of need.

Silks survive in Western Europe from the graves of important figures, used in book bindings, and also reliquaries. But it is clear they had a number of uses as hangings and drapes in churches and the houses of the wealthy, as well as for clothing and vestments. The sources rarely mention the specific origin of silks, but sometimes describe the designs in enough detail to allow an identification as Byzantine.

Anglo-Saxon England had silks from at least the late 7th century, brought back from Rome by Benedict Biscop and others. They were an essential, and easily carried, purchase for well-off pilgrims to Rome or the Holy Land (where Syrian or Egyptian silk might also be bought), and were available in England from English traders who certainly had bases in Rome and Pavia, and probably also bought from Scandinavian traders using the Baltic route. A unique special arrangement had to be made whereby the English crown paid directly a sum to Pavia in lieu of the customs duty on silk, which the Pavians found too difficult or dangerous to collect from English merchants. Diplomatic gifts also cascaded down from the Imperial court in Constantinople, with the rulers who received them passing many on to other rulers, and churches both in and outside their territory. Charlemagne gave not only King Offa of Mercia silks, but also the dioceses of Mercia and Northumbria.

== Tapestry and embroidery ==
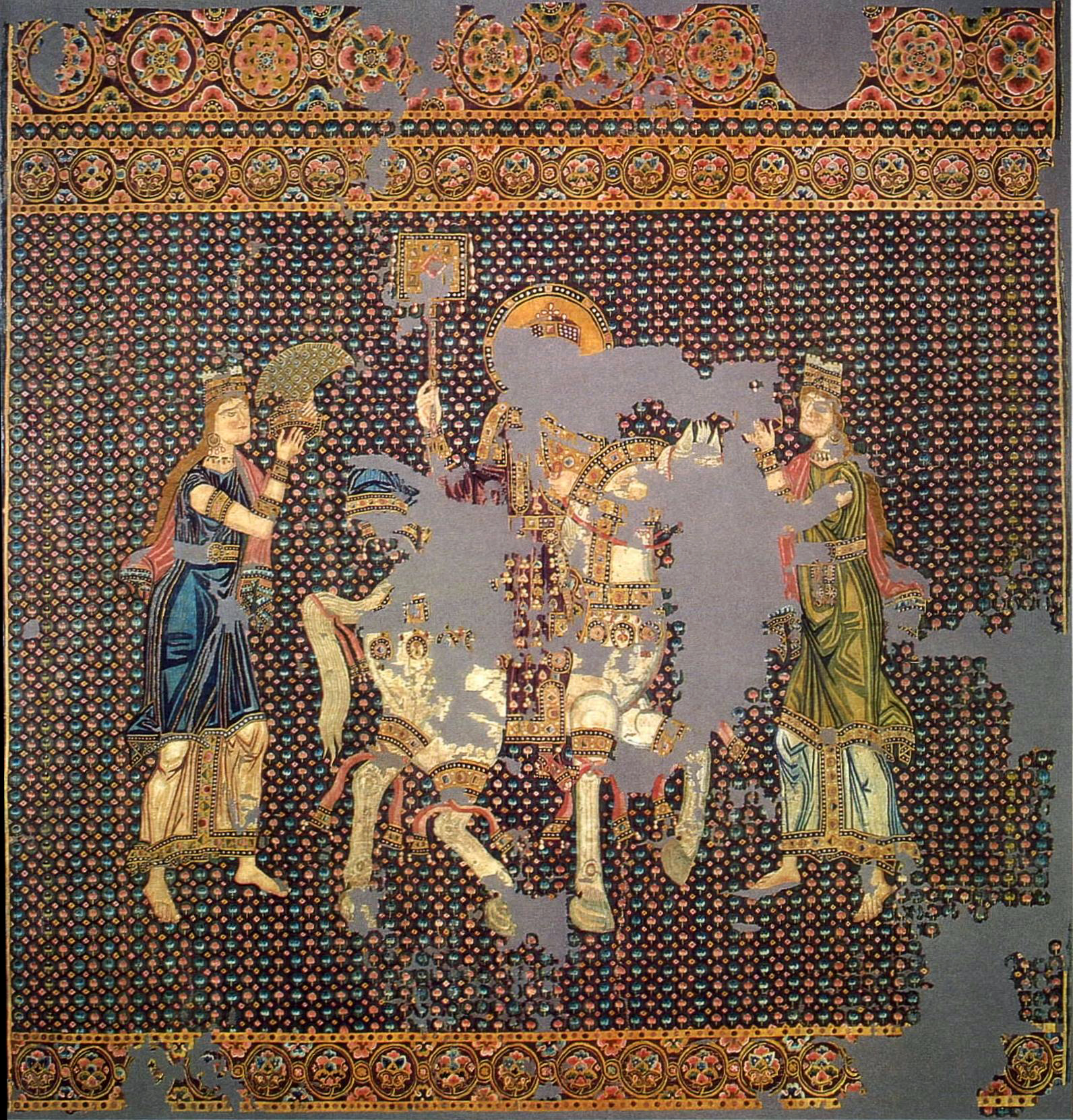
The "Bamberger Gunthertuch", an embroidered imperial hanging depicting the return of John Tzimiskes from a successful campaign of about 970.

In addition to woven dress and furnishing fabrics, Byzantine workshops were also known for woven tapestries and richly embroidered textiles with decoration that often included figurative scenes. The most impressive example to survive is the 10th century "Bamberger Gunthertuch", a woven tapestry piece over two metres square, with a mounted emperor between two female personifications. Nearly a century after it was made it was acquired by Bishop Gunther of Bamberg in Germany, on a pilgrimage to Constantinople. He died during the journey and it was used for his shroud. Embroidered religious scenes were also used for vestments and hangings, and the famous English Opus Anglicanum seems to have been heavily influenced by Byzantine embroidery. This continued Late Antique trends, which among other evidence are known from finds in Egyptian cemeteries, and the complaint by Saint Asterius of Amasia in around 410 about his flock in northeastern Turkey, where he says the laity decorated their clothes with religious images:

... they artfully produce, both for themselves and for their wives and children, clothing beflowered and wrought with ten thousand objects....When, therefore, they dress themselves and appear in public, they look like pictured walls in the eyes of those that meet them. And perhaps even the children surround them, smiling to one another and pointing out with the finger the picture on the garment; and walk along after them, following them for a long time. On these garments are lions and leopards; bears and bulls and dogs; woods and rocks and hunters ... You may see the wedding of Galilee, and the water-pots; the paralytic carrying his bed on his shoulders; the blind man being healed with the clay; the woman with the bloody issue, taking hold of the border of the garment; the sinful woman falling at the feet of Jesus; Lazarus returning to life from the grave. In doing this they consider that they are acting piously and are clad in garments pleasing to God. But if they take my advice let them sell those clothes and honour the living image of God. Do not picture Christ on your garments. It is enough that he once suffered the humiliation of dwelling in a human body which of his own accord he assumed for our sakes. So, not upon your robes but upon your soul carry about his image.

The Egyptian cemetery examples are usually in less fine textiles than silk, and are typically roundels or other simple shapes with a border and a scene inside. This style of design seems not dissimilar to mentions and the few survivals of religious embroidery from the West many centuries later. Some Western embroidery was imported, other pieces no doubt done locally on imported silk, though other materials were used. The only survival of such work on the largest scale, the enormous Bayeux Tapestry (incomplete at 0.5 by 68.38 metres or 1.6 by 224.3 ft) is wool embroidered on a plain linen background, and not technically a tapestry at all. However smaller scale figurative hangings and clothes in silk are mentioned.

== Decline ==
In 1147, during the Second Crusade, Roger II of Sicily (1095–1154) attacked Corinth and Thebes, two important centres of Byzantine silk production, capturing the weavers and their equipment and establishing his own silkworks in Palermo and Calabria. After the capture of Constantinople in 1204 by the forces of the Fourth Crusade (1202–1204) and the establishment of the Latin Empire (1204–1261) and other "Latin" states in the Byzantine territories, the Byzantine silk industry contracted, supplying only the domestic luxury market, and leadership in European silk-weaving and design passed to Sicily and the emerging Italian centres of Lucca and Venice.

== See also ==
- Byzantine art
- Byzantine dress
- Coptic textiles
- Persian embroidery
- Sampul tapestry
- Sichuan embroidery
- Sogdian textiles
