= Ezzolied =

Middle High German Christian poem

The Ezzolied, also known as the Cantilena de miraculis Christi (Song of the miracles of Christ) or the Anegenge (Beginning), is an early Middle High German poem written in the 1060s by Ezzo, a German scholar and priest of Bamberg. It is the first poetic text of the High Middle Ages to join German vernacular and Latin learning.

== Context ==
The "Vita Altmanni" relates that in 1065, when rumours of the approaching end of the world were rife, many people started on a pilgrimage to Jerusalem under the leadership of Bishop Gunther of Bamberg, and that Ezzo composed the poem on this occasion. The opening strophe of the Vorau manuscript does not mention the pilgrimage, but simply states that the bishop ordered Ezzo to write the song.

It survives in two recensions, associated with Strasbourg and Vorau. The poem was found by Barack in a Strasbourg manuscript of the late 11th century; but only a seven strophes have survived. The version found in Vorau is completed and consists of 34 strophes (because, as the text reminds the reader, Christ "lived among us thirty-three years ... and half of the thirty-fourth"). It is also expanded and the 7th strophe of the Strasbourg version is the 11th of the Vorau manuscript. Further, they also differ in genre as it seems that the Strasbourg version, which has strophes of equal length compared to the Vorau version, was sung while the later version probably not.

According to its origins in Bamberg, the song would probably have been composed in the East Franconian dialect, however, its two recensions, the Strasbourg and the Vorau, are written in Alemannic and Bavarian respectively; it relates in earnest language the creation, fall, and redemption of mankind.

== Content ==
The subject of the poem is the life of Jesus Christ. The trinitarian concept of God forms an important link between the beginning, middle and end of the poem: in the beginning the Trinity is revealed at the creation of mankind, in the middle at the baptism of Christ and at the end in the redemption of man.

Compared with the later Vorau version (around 1120), the Strasbourg version does not include a section on Christ's childhood, showing the growing interest in this part of Christ's life during the twelfth century.

== Influence ==
Very popular during the later Middle Ages, the Ezzolied had a great influence on the poetry of Southern Germany, and is valuable as a monument of the poetical literature of the time. It reveals, together with other German literature of the time such as the Annolied a growing awareness and pride in belonging to a larger collective of Germans. It was edited by P. Piper and Steinmayer (in Müllenhoff and Scherer "Denkmäler deutscher Poesie und Prosa aus dem VIII-XII Jahrhundert", Berlin, 1892).

== Sources ==
- Egert, Eugene (5 November 2018). The Holy Spirit in German Literature Until the End of the Twelfth Century. De Gruyter. ISBN 978-3111560762.
- Schultz, James A (July 2000). Sovereignty and Salvation in the Vernacular, 1050-1150 Das Ezzolied, Das Annolied, Die Kaiserchronik, Vv. 247-667, Das Lob Salomons, Historia Judith. Medieval Institute Publications. ISBN 1580445020.
- Ward, Emily Joan (4 August 2022). Royal Childhood and Child Kingship Boy Kings in England, Scotland, France and Germany, C. 1050-1262. Cambridge University Press. ISBN 978-1108838375.
