= War bonnet =

Native American feathered headgear

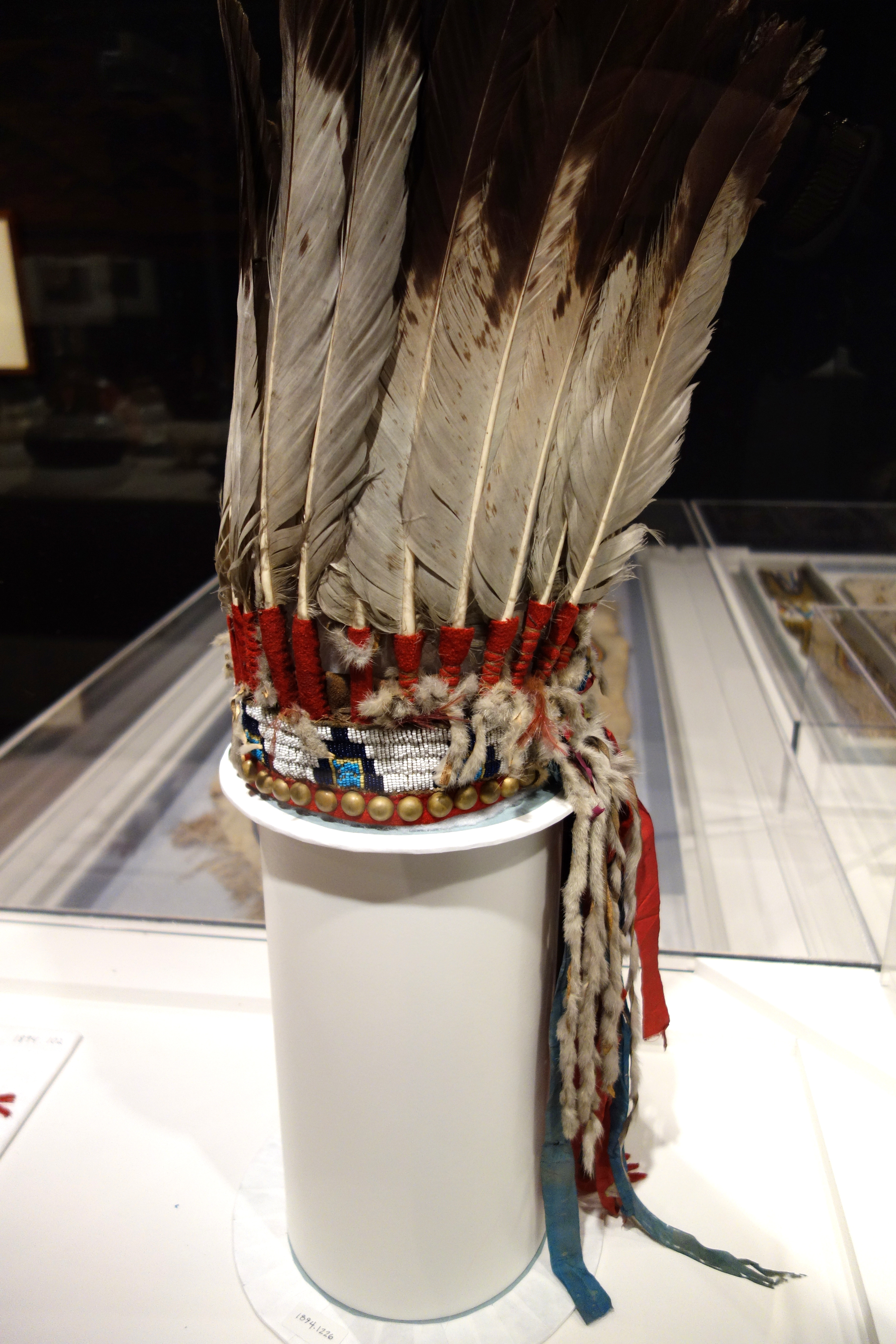
Eagle feather war bonnet, Cheyenne, 19th century, trade beads, eagle feathers, red stroud cloth

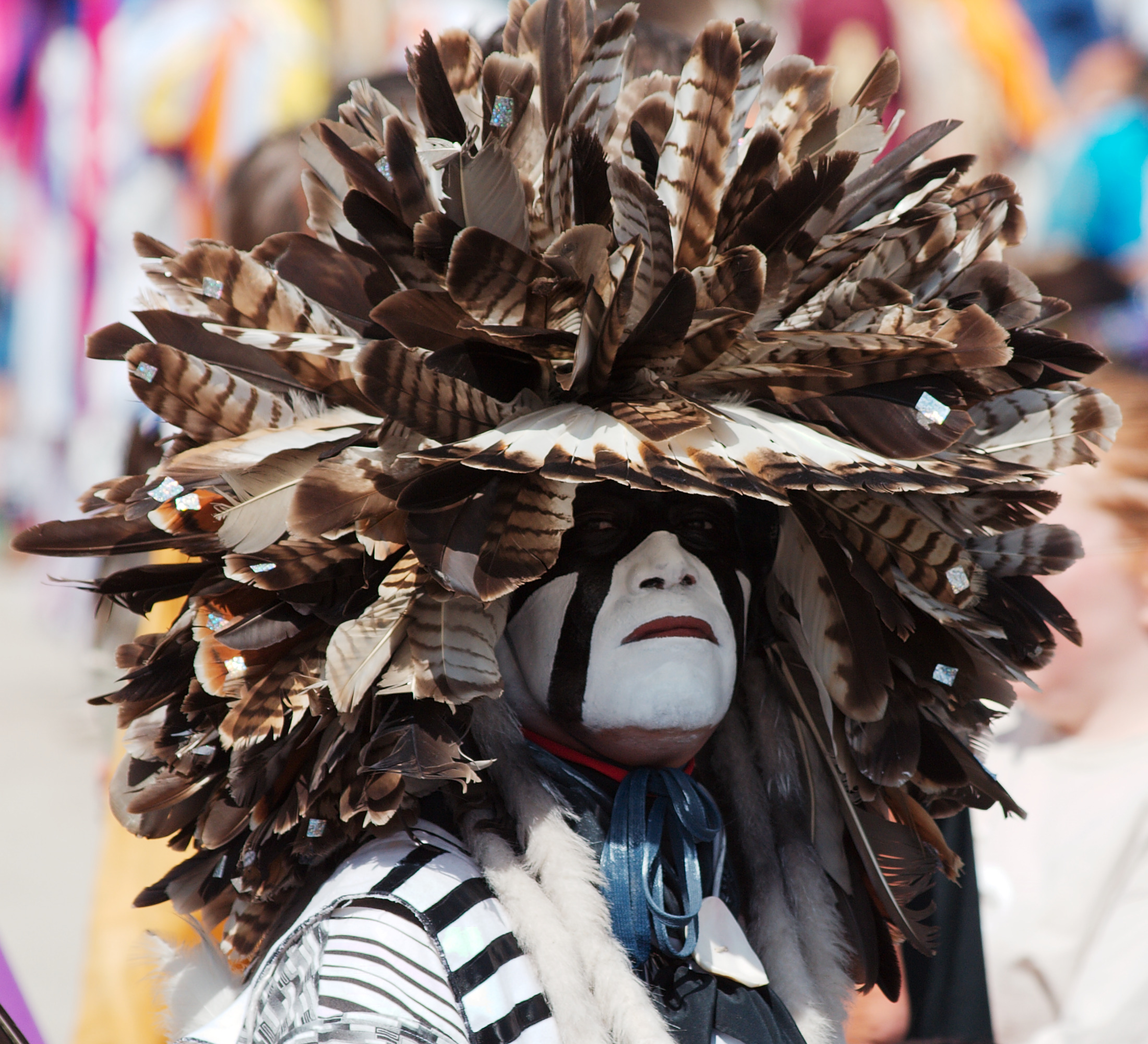
A modern-day Cheyenne dog soldier wearing a feathered headdress during a pow wow at the Indian Summer festival in Henry Maier Festival Park, Milwaukee, Wisconsin, 2008

War bonnets (also called warbonnets or headdresses) are feathered headgear traditionally worn by male leaders of the American Plains Indian Nations who have earned a place of great respect in their tribe. Originally they were sometimes worn into battle, but they are now primarily used for ceremonial occasions. In the Native American and First Nations communities that traditionally have these items of regalia, they are seen as items of great spiritual and political importance, only to be worn by those who have earned the right and honour through formal recognition by their people.

== Ceremonial importance ==
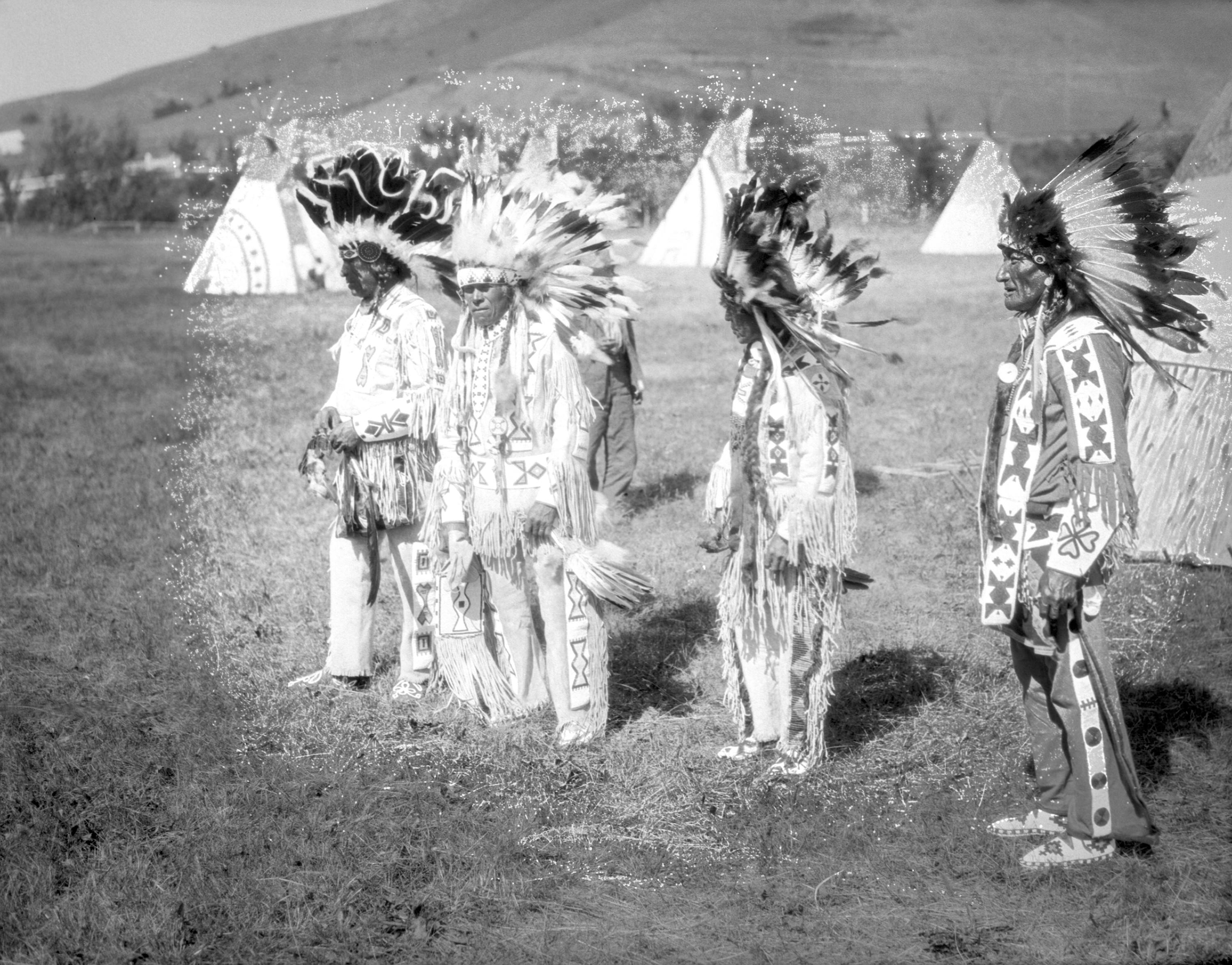
Unidentified Cree at a pow wow in Fort Qu'Appelle, Saskatchewan

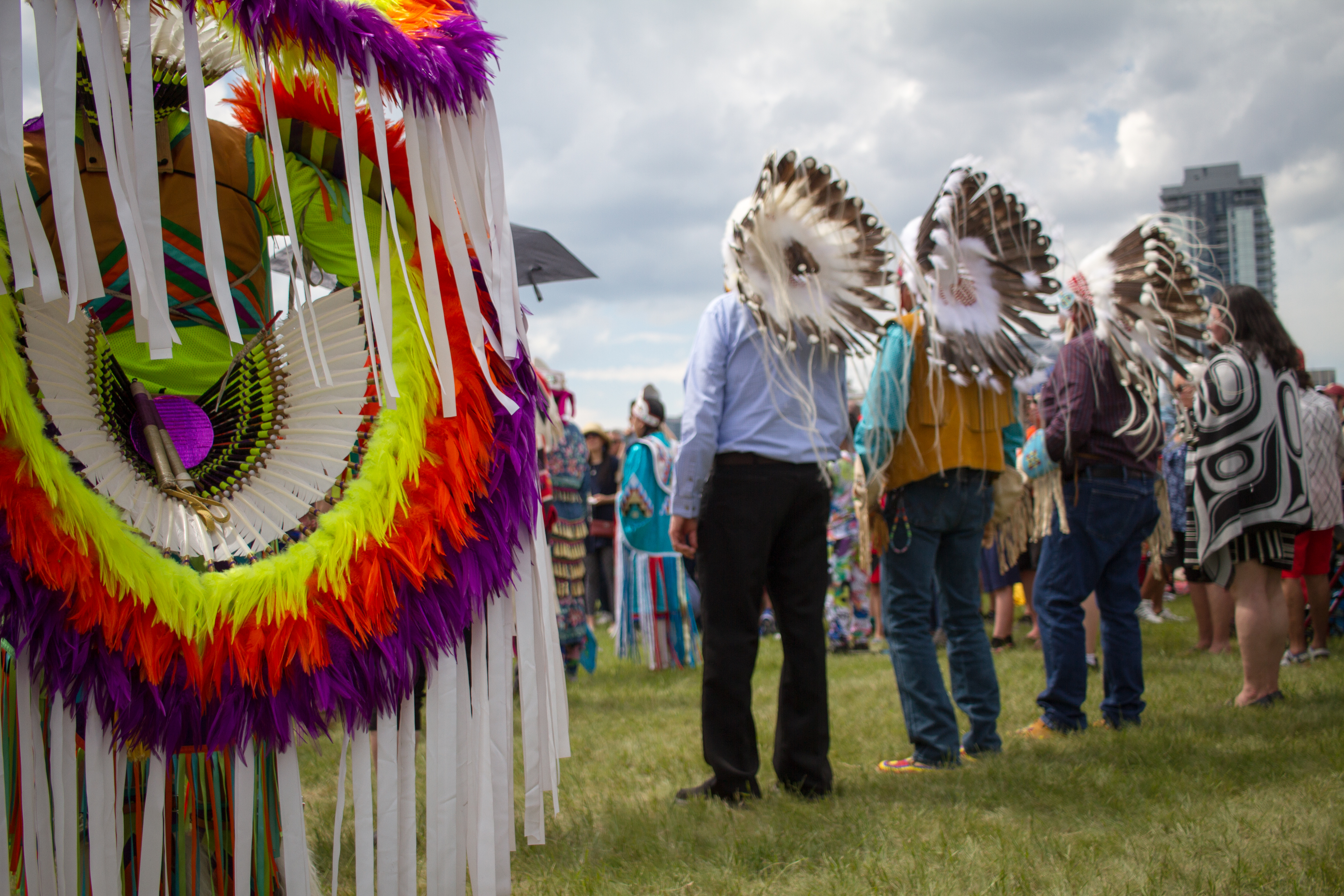
First Nations elders watch the Canada Day festivities in Calgary, Alberta, 2022.

Many Native American tribes consider the presentation of an eagle feather to be one of the highest marks of respect. An honored person must have earned their feather through selfless acts of courage and honour, or been gifted them in gratitude for their work or service to their community or Nation. Traditional deeds that bring honour can include acts of valor in battle (including contemporary military service), but also political and diplomatic gains, or acts that helped their community survive and prosper. The esteem attached to eagle feathers is traditionally so high that in many cases, such as a warrior (e.g. Dog Soldiers of the Cheyenne), only two or three honour feathers might be awarded in a person's whole lifetime. Historically, the warrior who was the first to touch an enemy in battle and escape unscathed received an eagle feather. When enough feathers were collected, they might be incorporated into a headdress or some other form of worn regalia. Historically, headdresses were usually reserved exclusively for the tribe's chosen political and spiritual leaders.

Roman Nose, who was one of the most influential Cheyenne warriors of the Plains Indian Wars of the 1860s, was known for his illustrious warbonnet that was said to protect him during battle. Several instances record how while wearing his war bonnet, he rode back and forth before soldiers of the United States Army and, despite being fired upon, was left unscathed.

While women have traditional regalia that can include other types of headdresses, historically women did not wear the most common style of Plains warbonnet. However, in recent years a few First Nations women who have attained a very high level of respect in their communities have been ceremonially gifted with headdresses of the type that were formerly only worn by men.

Due to their historical importance and status, traditional Native Americans now consider the wearing of headdresses without the express permission of tribal leaders to be an affront to their culture and traditions. Consequently, in cases where non-Native political leaders have been symbolically allowed to wear the headdress, this has caused controversy.

== Legality ==
Plains-style war bonnets are made out of eagle feathers because the eagle is considered by most tribes of the Interior Plains to be the greatest and most powerful of all birds. Under current United States federal legislation, the eagle feather law enables Native Americans to continue using eagle feathers in their traditional spiritual and cultural practices. The exemption is contained within the Migratory Bird Treaty Act of 1918. In the United States, only enrolled members of a federally recognized Native American tribe may legally collect or possess eagle feathers.

One traditional method of acquiring feathers for war bonnets is to pluck the most mature tail feathers of young eagles while still in the nest. This can be done three times before the feathers do not grow back. As many as thirty-six feathers can be collected in this manner. If care is taken in not disturbing the nest, this method can be repeated yearly.

== Plains-style bonnets ==
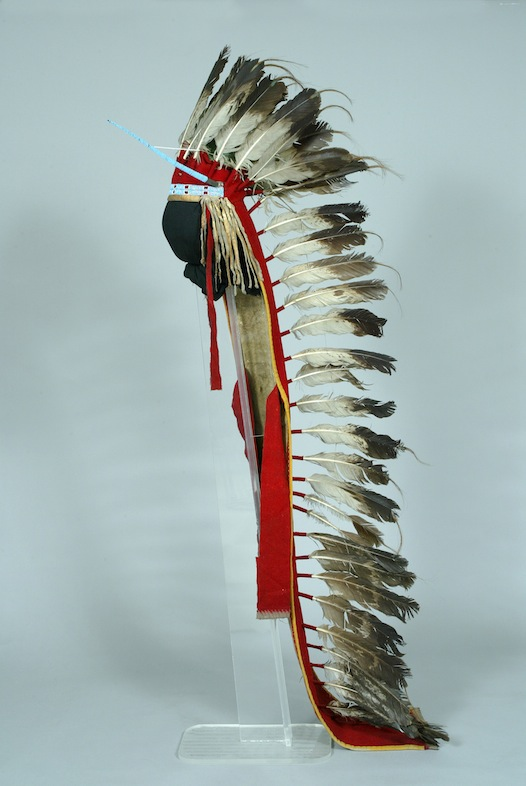
In the collection of the Children's Museum of Indianapolis

Plains Indians use eagle feathers as the most significant part of the headdress to represent honor and respect. Some Plains-style bonnet forms are the "horned" bonnet, "flaring" eagle feather bonnet, and the "fluttering feather" bonnet. The "horned" bonnet can consist of a buckskin skull cap, shaved bison or cow horns, and dyed horsehair with bunches of owl feathers beneath the skull cap. The "flaring" eagle feather bonnet is often made of golden eagle tail feathers connected to a buckskin or felt crown. There are slits at the base of the crown that allow the bonnet to have a "flaring" look. An unusual form of bonnet is the "fluttering feather" bonnet, with the feathers loosely attached to a felt or buckskin cap, hanging at the sides.

== Cultural appropriation ==
Native American cultural representatives and activists have expressed offense at what they deem the cultural appropriation of wearing and displaying of such headdresses, and other "indigenous traditional arts and sacred objects" by those who have not earned them, especially by non-Natives as fashion or costume. The controversy is part of a wider effort by Native American activists to highlight what they view as the ongoing cultural genocide against indigenous peoples in the United States and Canada. The trend of musicians and festival-goers wearing warbonnets became fashionable in the 2010s, and has led to criticism by Native Americans, apologies by non-Natives, and the banning of the sale or wearing of them as costumes by several music festivals.

Jay Kay, front man of the British acid jazz/funk band Jamiroquai, has repeatedly used a feather headdress (or in some cases a similar design) as part of his costume design for various videos and branding, such as in the MV for the song Corner of the Earth.

An article by scholars Kristin A. Carpenter and Angela R. Riley states:

To explain Native peoples' discomfort with non-Indians wearing headdresses, for example, it is necessary to go back to the indigenous perspective and evaluate what the headdress means specifically to the various tribes, Crow and Lakota to name two, that make and use them. Without such context, it's impossible for non-Indians in contemporary settings to grasp the offense and harm that indigenous people feel when sacred objects and imagery are co-opted, commercialized, and commodified for non-Indians' benefit.

== See also ==
- Toupha

== Notes ==
=== Bibliography ===
- Hardin, Barry E. (2013). The Plains Warbonnet: Its Story and Construction. Book Publishing Company. ISBN 9781929572236.
- Hirschfelder, Arlene; Molin, Paulette F.; Wakim, Yvonne; Dorris, Michael A. (1999). American Indian Stereotypes in the World of Children: A Reader and Bibliography. Scarecrow Press. ISBN 9781461656302.
- Waldman, Carl (2014). Encyclopedia of Native American Tribes. Infobase Publishing. ISBN 9781438110103.
