= Gunther of Bamberg =

German nobleman and prelate

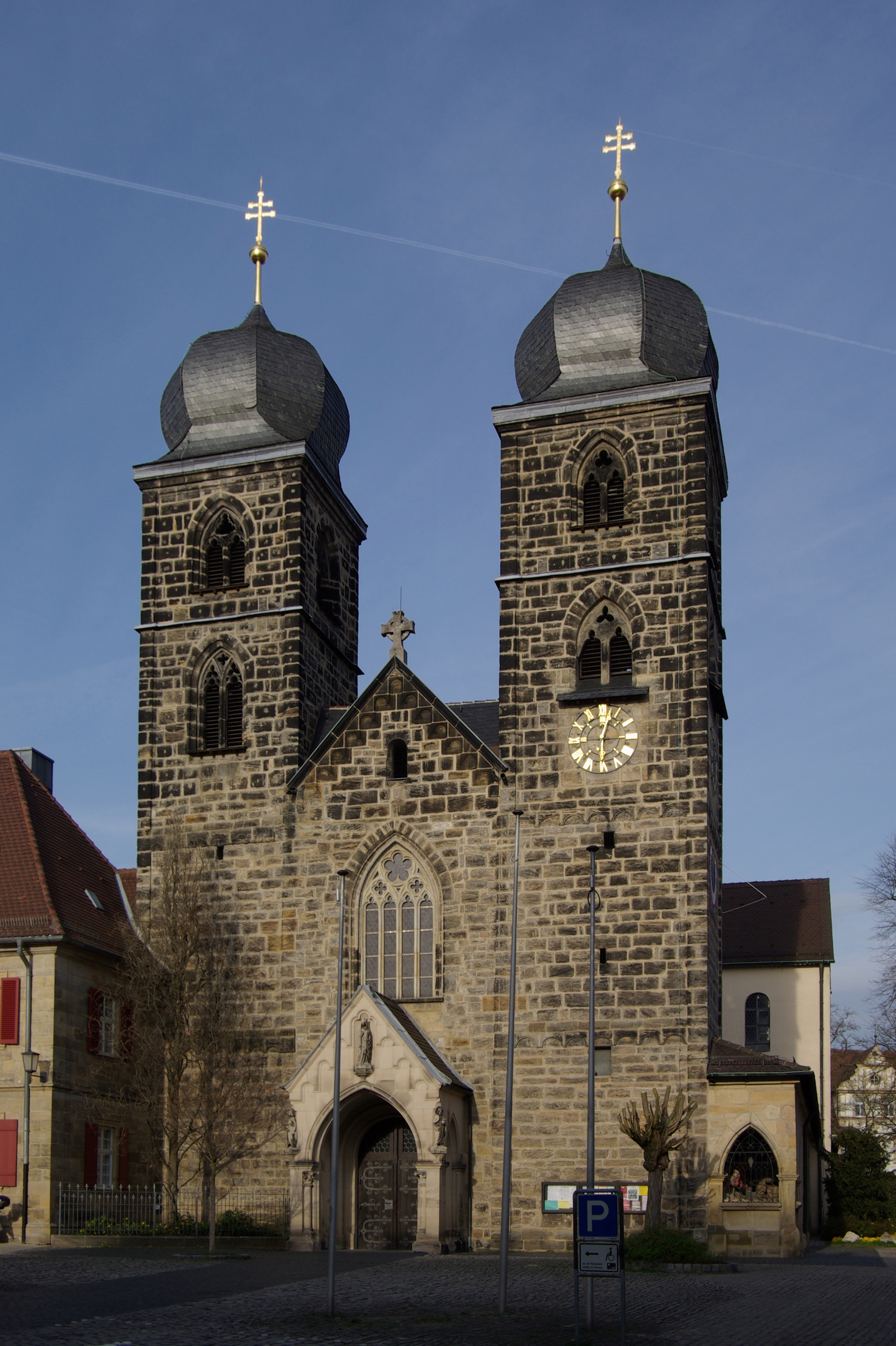
Church of Saint Gangolf in Bamberg, founded by Gunther for his canons.

Gunther (1025/1030 – 23 July 1065) was a German nobleman and prelate of the Holy Roman Empire. He served as Chancellor of Italy from 1054 until 1057 and as Bishop of Bamberg from 1057 until his death. He was the leader of the Great German Pilgrimage of 1064–65, on which he died.

Gunther was a regular at the imperial court, a man of luxurious living and a patron of letters. He revived High German literature with his commissioning of the Ezzolied on the eve of his pilgrimage. He was buried in a rich silk, the so-called Gunthertuch, that he had acquired on the pilgrimage.

== Family ==
Although he belonged to the high nobility, Gunther's parentage is unknown. According to Lampert of Hersfeld, "he was born among the first of the palace" (natus erat ex primis palacii). He was certainly close to the court of the Emperor Henry III (died 1056).

There are two main theories of his relations. One, on the basis of necrologies and property holdings, relates him to the Margraves of Meissen. The other, placing more emphasis on properties, holds that Gunther was a son of a certain count named Pilgrim who held Salaberg and Haag and was related to the Aribonids.

Gunther's mother's name was Gerbirg. She died between 1050 and 1060. The historian Ernst Klebel, who held the second view of Gunther's paternity, argued that she belonged to the Eppensteiner family of the Dukes of Carinthia. This would make Gunther a relative of his predecessor in the see of Bamberg, Adalbero.

Gunther himself owned large estates throughout the March of Austria and in Carinthia.

== Clerical career ==
Gunther was the provost of Hainburg from at least 1051. He also held a canonry in the collegiate church of Saints Simon and Jude, founded by Henry III in his favored city of Goslar. He was appointed Chancellor of Italy by Henry III. The first record of him in that post is from 31 May 1054. As chancellor he was close to Pope Victor II and to the Empress-dowager Agnes of Poitou. He was retained by Agnes after Henry III's death, when she became regent for her son, Henry IV. At the instigation of Agnes, he was elected Bishop of Bamberg in March 1057 and confirmed by Henry IV on 30 March. He was succeeded as chancellor by the man he probably recommended, Wibert of Parma.

In church politics, Gunther was an ally of Archbishop Anno II of Cologne, who had headed the cathedral school at Bamberg until 1054. With Anno's help he recouped ecclesiastical property at Forchheim and Fürth. In Bamberg itself, Gunther built the collegiate church of Saint Gangolf. Like most churchmen who owed their position to the patronage of the Salian emperors, Gunther was sympathetic to but did not promote the Gregorian church reform.

Gunther held the first diocesan synod of Bamberg on 13 April 1059. The synod rejected the nineteen proprietary and jurisdictional claims of the diocese of Würzburg presented by the advocate of Würzburg, Count Eberhard. As late as 1063, the dispute over the tithes of Neubruch was still active. At the same synod, Gunther declared his intention of forcing the Slavs living in his diocese between the Main and the Regnitz rivers to conform their marriages to canon law and to pay tithes or else face expulsion.

In 1060, Gunther broke with the regent Agnes when she refused to support his claim to authority over the monastery of Bergen, which was disputed by the diocese of Eichstätt. He withdrew from attendance at court and there were rumours that he was plotting a rebellion. These rumours were used as justification by some to seize territory belonging to Bamberg. He was partially reconciled to the regent in late 1061, but only her retirement in 1062 brought about his full reconciliation with the imperial court.

== Pilgrimage ==
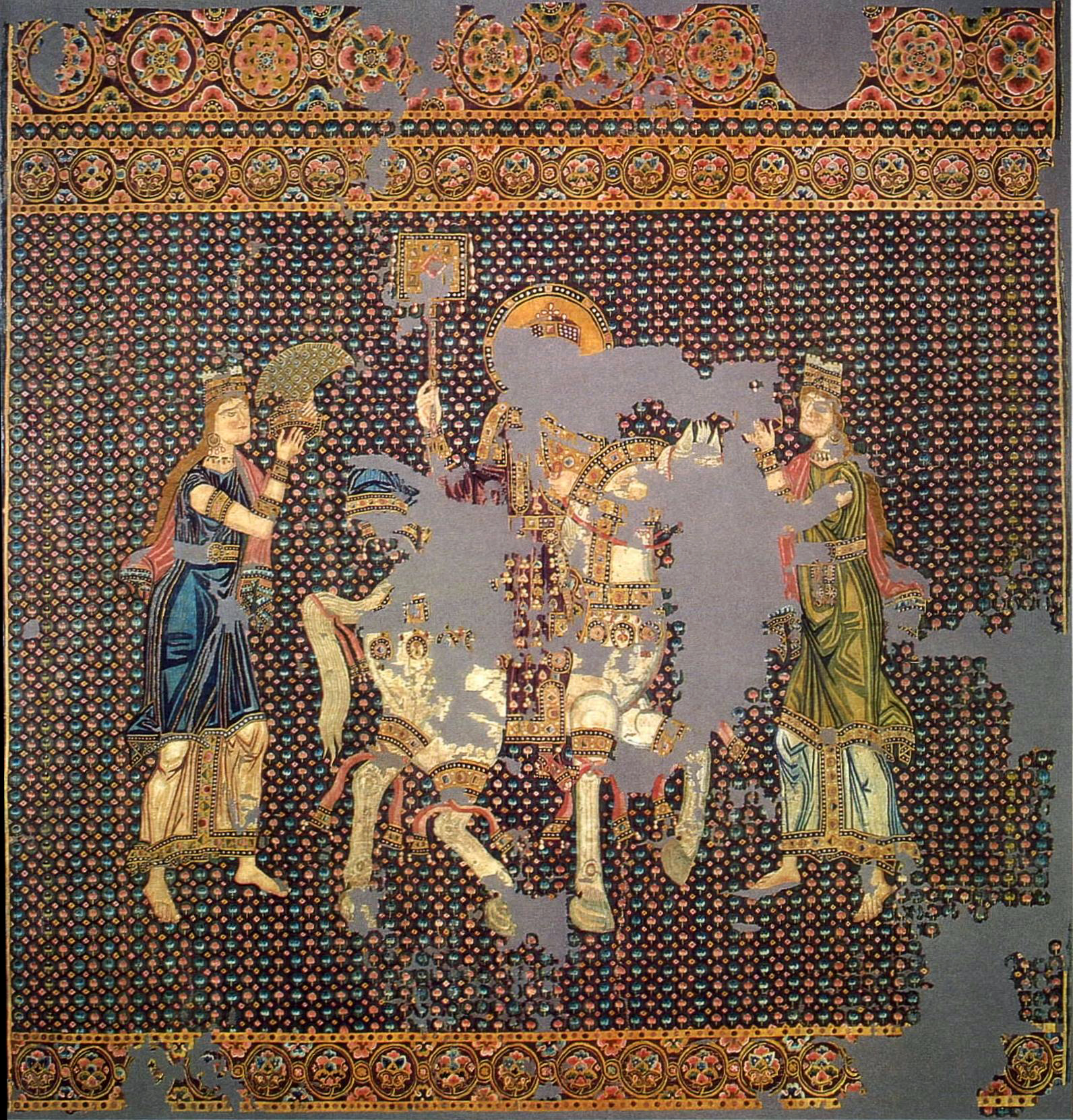
The partially damaged Byzantine silk that Gunther brought back from his pilgrimage.

In 1064 Gunther, accompanied by Archbishop Siegfried of Mainz, led a large pilgrimage to Jerusalem. According to the Annales Altahenses maiores, they travelled first to Constantinople, capital of the Byzantine Empire, by way of Hungary, an overland pilgrimage route that had only been opened by the conversion of Hungary to Christianity in the previous decades. The same annals record that the young Gunther was suspected by Byzantine authorities of being the Emperor Henry IV in disguise and so encountered difficulties in Constantinople.

At Latakia, Gunther received a warning that parties of Muslim bandits lay ahead. His band of pilgrims was attacked near Caesarea and suffered heavy losses. The bandits had apparently been attracted by the ostentatious wealth Gunther had brought along. The unarmed pilgrims were unsure if it was morally permissible for them, as pilgrims, to resist their attackers, but ultimately some did.

The delay caused by the bandits prevented Gunther from reaching Jerusalem in time for Easter. In the end, he spent only thirteen days in the city. He left Jerusalem to return home on 25 April 1065. He died at Ödenburg while passing through Hungary on 23 July.

Gunther brought back from his pilgrimage a Byzantine silk, the so-called Gunthertuch (Gunther cloth), featuring a man on horseback receiving crowns from two female figures, probably Tychai. He was buried with it under the altar of Saint Gertrude in the original Bamberg Cathedral. In the thirteenth century, he was disinterred and reburied in the east choir, the Georgenchor, when the cathedral was rebuilt.

== Literary patronage ==
Gunther is an especially vivid eleventh-century figure because of the detailed surviving letters of his scholaster Meinhard. He criticised the bishop for his luxurious living—alleging that he was so idle and fat that he needed to be "rolled out [of bed] by mechanical contraptions" (mechanicis apparatibus ... evolvendus)—and his literary tastes, which were decidedly secular, tending mainly towards the legends about Theoderic the Great. According to Meinhard, Gunther "never thought about Augustine, (Note: Augustine of Hippo, fourth-century theologian.) never about Gregory, (Note: Gregory the Great, sixth-century pope.) [but] was always discussing Attila, (Note: Attila the Hun, fifth-century barbarian leader.) always the Amalung (Note: Amal dynasty, rulers of the Ostrogoths in the fifth and sixth centuries.) and others of that kind". It has been suggested, based on a certain reading of Meinhard, that Gunther himself probably wrote secular poetry and may even have participated in "dramatic presentations" or knightly games at court.

Gunther commissioned the Ezzolied, the earliest Middle High German poem. This ended a period of over a century and a half during which no major work in the High German vernacular had appeared since the Old High German poem Christus und die Samariterin around 900. The Ezzolied was written by its namesake, Ezzo, and its accompanying melody was composed by Willo, both priests of Bamberg. In one manuscript, the opening strophe of the Ezzolied records how Gunther ordered its composition:

Der guote biscoph Guntere vone Babenberch, [The worthy Bishop of Bamberg, Gunther]
der hiez machen ein vil guot werch: [directed that a splendid work be written]
er hiez di sine phaphen [He bade his priests]
ein guot liet machen. [to write a lofty hymn]

The Ezzolied is an account of the works of the Trinity from Creation to the crucifixion. According to the biography of Bishop Altmann of Passau, who took part in the pilgrimage of 1064–65, the author of the Ezzolied was also among the pilgrims and he composed the song to be sung on the journey. Other theories tie its composition to Gunther's imposition of the Augustinian Rule on his canons, to the dedication of Saint Gangolf's or even to Meinhard's criticism of Gunther's interest in secular poetry. On this last theory, the Ezzolied was commissioned by Gunther to provide a religious poem in the vernacular that could compete with the legends about Theoderic the Great.

== Sources ==
- Benjamin Arnold (1992). "From Warfare on Earth to Eternal Paradise: Archbishop Anno II of Cologne, the History of the Western Empire in the Annolied, and the Salvation of Mankind". Viator, 23: 95–114. doi:10.1484/j.viator.2.301274
- Harry Breßlau (1879). "Gunther, Bischof von Bamberg" . Allgemeine Deutsche Biographie (in German). Vol. 10. Leipzig: Duncker & Humblot. pp. 137–139.
- Carl Erdmann (1936). "Fabulae Curiales: Neues zum Spielmannsgesang und zum Ezzo-Liede". Zeitschrift für deutsches Altertum und deutsche Literatur, 73 (1): 87–98.
- Francis G. Gentry (2002). "German Literature to 1160", pp. 53–116 in Francis G. Gentry (ed.), A Companion to Middle High German Literature to the 14th Century. Leiden: Brill.
- Peter Godman (2014). The Archpoet and Medieval Culture. Oxford: Oxford University Press.
- William Cecil McDonald (1972). A Survey of German Medieval Literary Patronage from Charlemagne to Maximilian I (PhD diss.) Ohio State University.
- Paul B. Pixton (1995). The German Episcopacy and the Implementation of the Decrees of the Fourth Lateran Council, 1216–1245: Watchmen on the Tower. Leiden: E. J. Brill.
- Emil E. Ploß (1966). "Gunther". Neue Deutsche Biographie (in German). Vol. 7. Berlin: Duncker & Humblot. pp. 323–324. (full text online).
- Jonathan Riley-Smith (1997). The First Crusaders, 1095–1131. Cambridge: Cambridge University Press.
- I. S. Robinson (1999). Henry IV of Germany, 1056–1106. Cambridge: Cambridge University Press.
- Nina Rowe (2011). The Jew, the Cathedral and the Medieval City: Synagoga and Ecclesia in the Thirteenth Century. Cambridge: Cambridge University Press.
