= Great German Pilgrimage of 1064–65 =

Pilgrimage to Jerusalem

The Great German Pilgrimage of 1064–1065 was a large pilgrimage to Jerusalem which took place a generation before the First Crusade.

== Events ==
It originated in the Kingdom of Germany in 1064, and was led by Archbishop Siegfried of Mainz, Bishop William of Utrecht, Bishop Otto of Ratisbon (modern-day Regensburg), and Bishop Gunther of Bamberg. There were between seven and twelve thousand pilgrims, coming primarily from western and southern Germany and including apart from clerics also nobles, knights and commoners. For all that is known, the participants were unarmed and it seems that the dominant person on this pilgrimage was Bishop Gunter. The pilgrimage started in November 1064 and passed through Hungary, Bulgaria, Patzinakia, and Constantinople, just as the First Crusade would over thirty years later, with similar results: the pilgrims were treated harshly wherever they went, and were ushered off into Anatolia once they reached Constantinople.

They passed through Anatolia and Cilicia, which had not yet been conquered by the Seljuk Turks, as it was by the time of the crusade. Their troubles increased when they reached Latakia, the last outpost of the Byzantine Empire before entering Muslim territory; there they met other pilgrims who warned them of the dangers to the south, and when they reached Tripoli, Lebanon, they were attacked by the emir of the city, but were saved by a storm which they regarded as a miracle.

On Holy Thursday they reached Caesarea, and on 25 March, Good Friday, they were attacked by Bedouin bandits. While many pilgrims refrained, due to religious reasons, from fighting back, several others attempted to fend off the attackers. According to the longer version of the Annals of Altaich William of Utrecht was killed in battle, (although he actually survived and lived until 1076). The pilgrims fled to a nearby fort and defended themselves there, suffering from exhaustion, heat and thirst. On Easter Sunday the Bedouin leaders met with Gunther there and agreed to a truce, but the Bedouins threatened to kill the pilgrims anyway. Gunther took the leaders as prisoners and threatened the rest to have them executed if they attacked again, thus stalling of another attack of the remaining bandits.

On Easter Monday the Fatimid governor of Ramla drove off the Bedouins and freed the pilgrims, who then rested in Ramla for two weeks. They arrived in Jerusalem on April 12. After thirteen days they returned to Ramla, and it seems that they took ships from Jaffa to Latakia to avoid the dangerous land route. From there, they returned via Asia Minor and Hungary to Germany. Gunter of Bamberg, however, died on July 23 in Oedenburg due to an illness after having made his confession. According to the chronicler, he was but one of the many who did not return: "out of seven thousand, not two thousand returned".

== Legacy ==
The mistreatment the pilgrims experienced in the Holy Land shows the growing insecurity that pilgrims had to deal with on their way to Jerusalem in the second half of the eleventh century. It fits into a row of other instances and while it may not have itself generated the crusading idea, it can hardly be doubted that it was used as an argument for the First Crusade that would start 30 years after this event.

The Ezzolied, composed either on or just before the pilgrimage by the priest Ezzo, is one of the most important examples of poetical literature at that time.

== Sources ==
- Annales Altahenses Maiores, 8, a. 1065, MGH, SS. XX. 815–17, trans. James Brundage, "The Crusades: A Documentary History", (Milwaukee, WI: Marquette University Press, 1962) (online)
- Einar Joranson (1928). "The Great German Pilgrimage of 1064–1065". In Paetow, Louis J. (ed.). The Crusades and Other Historical Essays Presented to Dana C. Munro by his Former Students. New York: Crofts. pp. 3–43.
