= Siegfried I (archbishop of Mainz) =

Archbishop of Mainz from 1060 to 1084

- Archbishop of Mainz
- Church: Catholic Church
- Diocese: Electorate of Mainz
- In office: 1060–1084

Personal details
- Died: 16 February 1084

Siegfried I (died 16 February 1084) was the Abbot of Fulda from 25 December 1058 until 6 January 1060, and from January 1060 until his death in February 1084, he was Archbishop of Mainz.

== Family ==
Siegfried was a member of the Frankish Reginbodonen family of the Rhineland. His father, also called Siegfried, was count of the Königssondergau. Count Siegfried was succeeded by his son Udalric, who was count of the Königssondergau and advocate of the diocesan church of Mainz from 1052 to 1074.

== Career in the church ==
Siegfried was educated in the monastery of Fulda and became a monk there. On 25 December 1058, he was appointed abbot of Fulda and on 6 January 1060, the Empress Agnes appointed him Archbishop of Mainz. In Spring 1062, he entered the political realm as a member of the faction surrounding Anno II of Cologne, who forcibly took control of the regency of the young king, Henry IV in the Coup of Kaiserswerth. Nevertheless, Siegfried never had the political influence of Anno or Adalbert of Bremen, and remained a 'third force'.

In Winter 1064 – 1065, he undertook a pilgrimage to Jerusalem. In 1069 he presided over the assembly of Worms, at which Henry IV announced his intention to repudiate his wife Bertha. Siegfried wrote to Pope Alexander II asking for help with the matter. In 1070, he took a pilgrimage to Rome to seek the permission of Pope Alexander II to lay down his title and abdicate, but the pope refused him. Together with Anno II of Cologne, in 1071, he founded a Benedictine monastery at Saalfeld.

In 1072, under the pretext of a pilgrimage to Santiago de Compostela, he sojourned at Cluny, where he met the Abbot Hugh the Great. The Mainzers, however, demanded his return before he made it to Spain. Upon his return, he ardently undertook the Cluniac reform in his diocese. In 1074, in that vein, he established the monasteries of Ravengiersburg and Hasungen.

Siegfried initially sided with Henry IV in the Investiture Controversy between the Holy Roman Emperor and the Roman Catholic Pope. He was one of the German bishops who attempted to depose Pope Gregory VII in 1076. Yet later that same year, when Gregory VII excommunicated Henry IV, Siegfried did an about-face and, at a general assembly of German Aristocrats in Tribur in October 1076, participated in the election of an anti-king, supporting the nobility opposing the Emperor in the civil war that became known as the Great Saxon revolt. Subsequently, Siegfried was driven from his diocese by the outraged royalist citizenry revolting against his rule. Nonetheless, on 25 March 1077, he crowned Henry IV's brother-in-law, duke Rudolf of Rheinfelden as Antiking, since the allied rebels of which he was a part needed the military prestige and might of a king to offset the power of the established monarch given his rapprochement with the Pope. On 26 December 1081, he crowned Herman of Salm as the second anti-king in Goslar. After 1081, he ceased to involve himself in public affairs until his death at Hasungen, where he was buried.

== Sources ==
- Sigrid Duchhardt-Bösken (1995). "Siegfried I (archbishop of Mainz)". In Bautz, Traugott (ed.). Biographisch-Bibliographisches Kirchenlexikon (BBKL) (in German). Vol. 10. Herzberg: Bautz. cols. 101–102. ISBN 3-88309-062-X.
- Lexikon des Mittelalters: Band VII Spalte 1865.
- Hannach, Eugen. Erzbischof Siegfried I. von Mainz als persönlicher und politischer Charakter. Rostock, 1900.
- Herrmann, Max. "Siegfried I., Erzbischof von Mainz. 1060-1084." Beitrag zur Geschichte König Heinrichs IV. Leipzig, 1889.
- Rudolph, Rainer. "Erzbischof Siegfried von Mainz (1060-1084)." Ein Beitrag zur Geschichte der Mainzer Erzbischöfe im Investiturstreit. Frankfurt, 1973.
- John Eldevik, Episcopal Power and Ecclesiastical Reform in the German Empire: Tithes, Lordship, and Community, 950–1150 (Cambridge, 2012).

== Notes ==
Catholic Church titles
Preceded by Luitpold	Archbishop of Mainz; 1060–1084	Succeeded by Wezilo
