= Wolfgang Katzheimer =

German painter

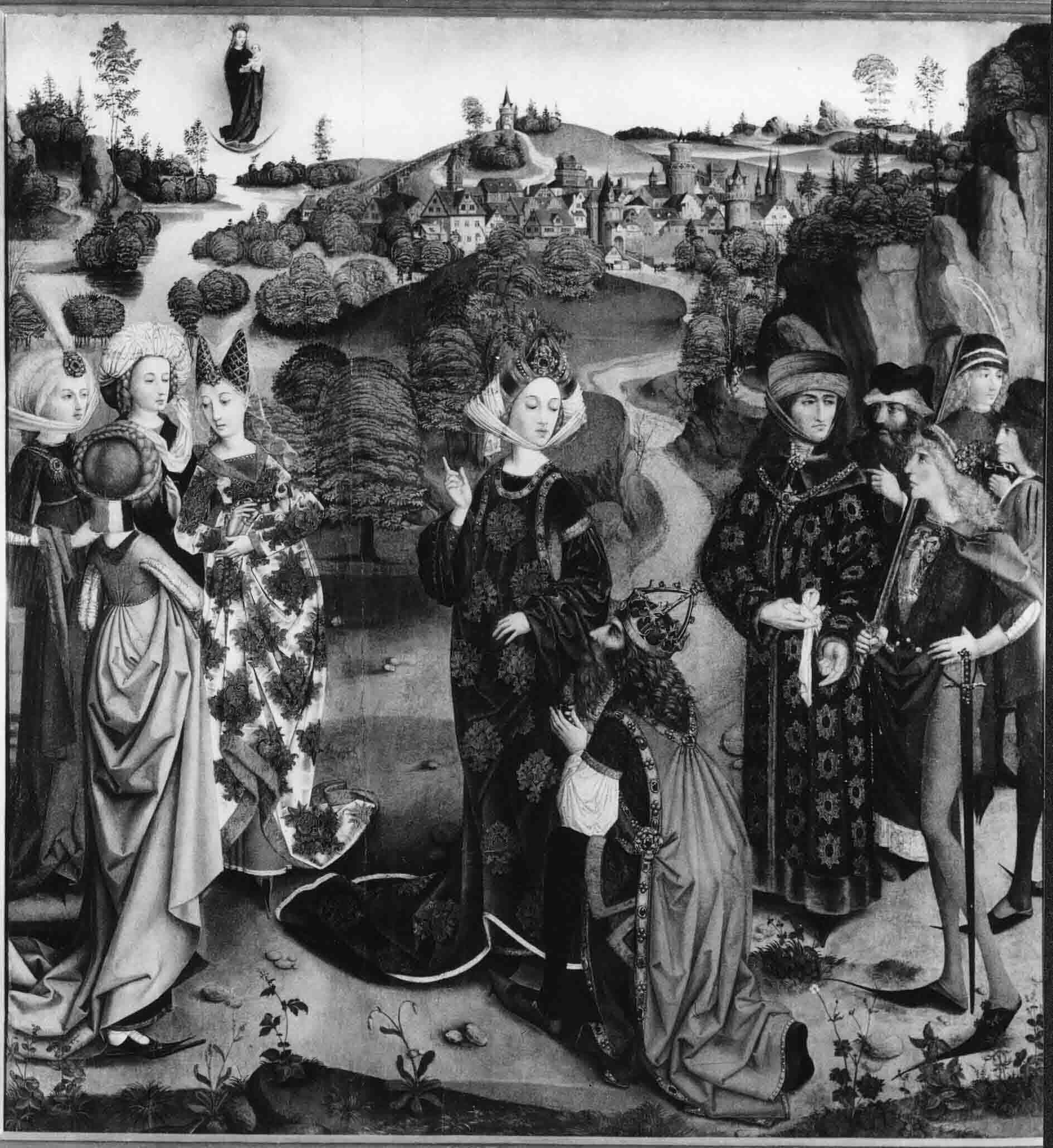
Augustus and the Tiburtine Sibyl (circa 1500) by Wolfgang Katzheimer

Wolfgang Katzheimer the elder (German: Wolfgang Katzheimer der Ältere; c. 1430 — 1508, Bamberg) was a German painter, draftsman, and designer. From 1465 he was master of a workshop in Bamberg that produced paintings and woodcarvings.

Very little of his work has survived: two stone carvings that he designed and 22 woodcuts based on his drawings. No surviving paintings can with certainty be attributed to him.

Katzheimer had two sons, Wolfgang Katzheimer the younger and Bernhard Katzheimer, who were both minor artists. It is possible that he was a close relative of the painter Lorenz Katzheimer, who was likely the anonymous master known as Master L. Cz.

== Gallery ==
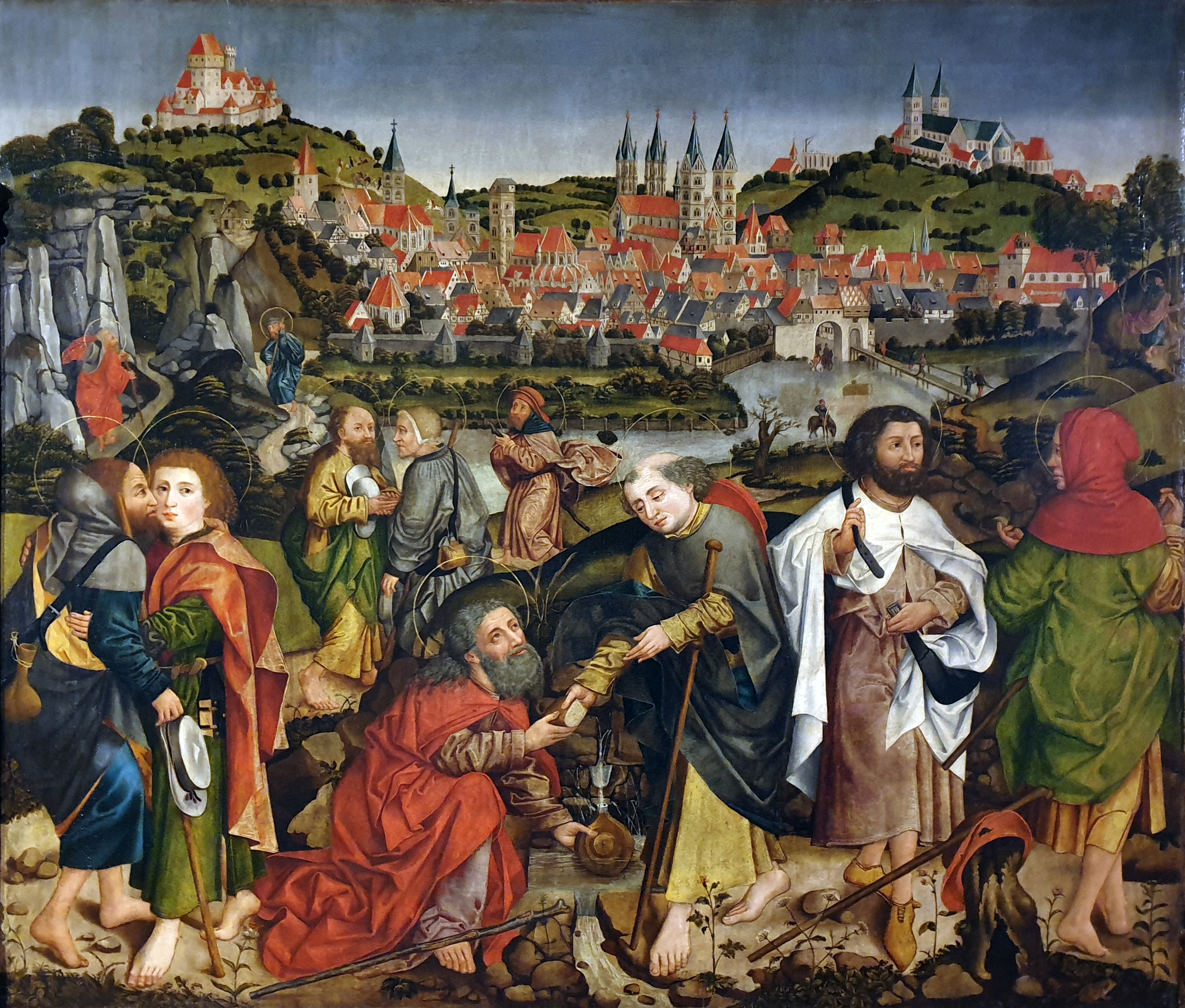
Sending out the apostles (1485)

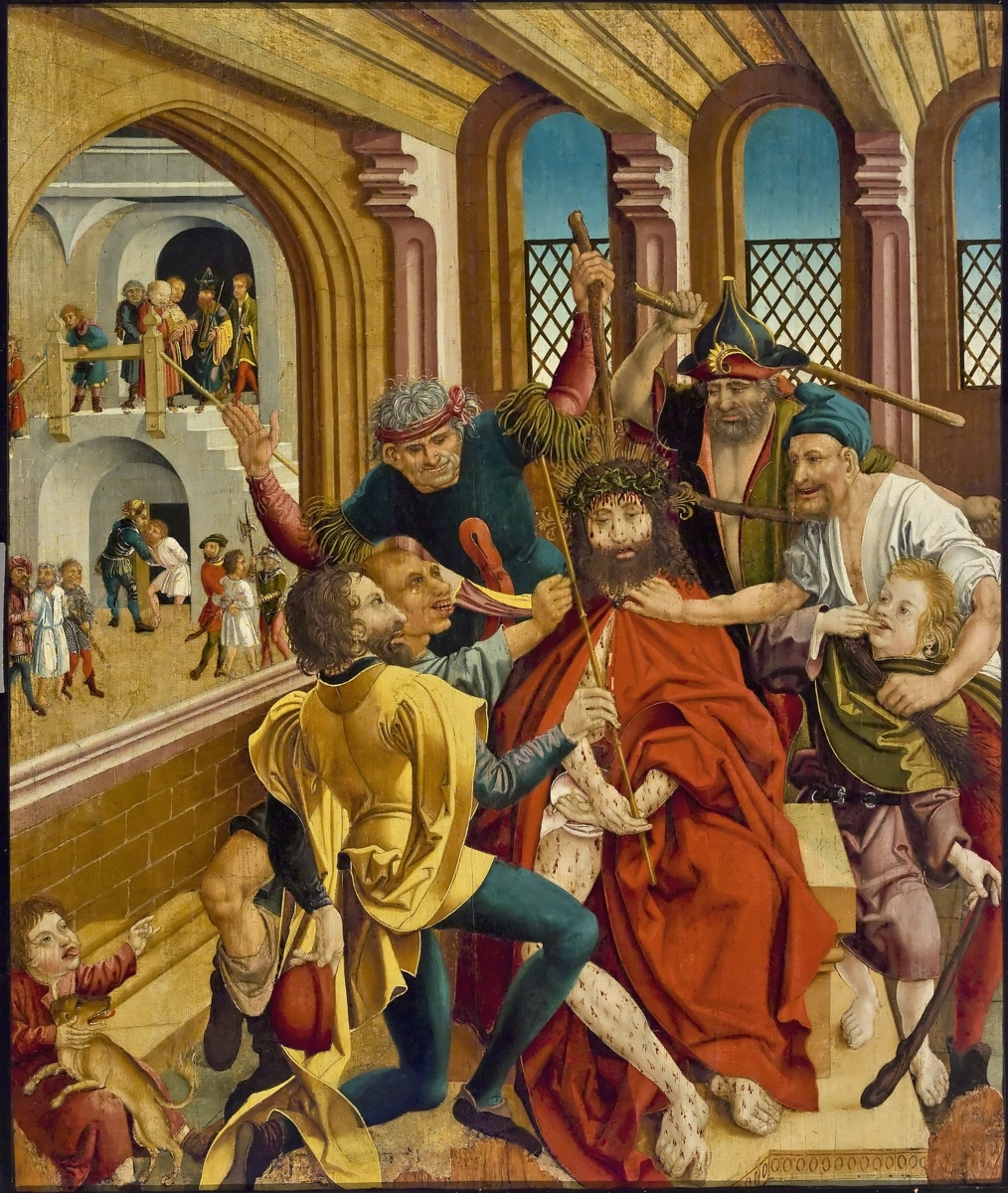
Mocking of Christ (circa 1500)

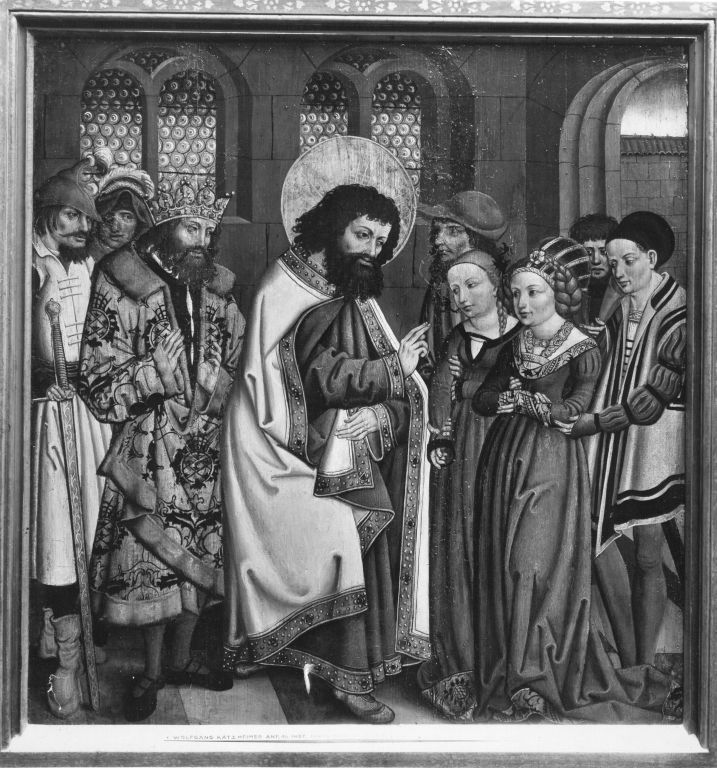
St. Bartholomew frees the Armenian king's daughter from the devil (circa 1500)

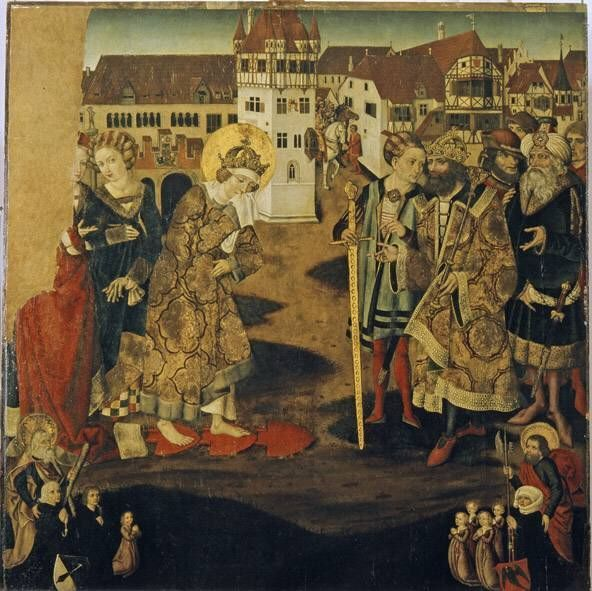
Trial by fire of St. Kunigunde (circa 1500)

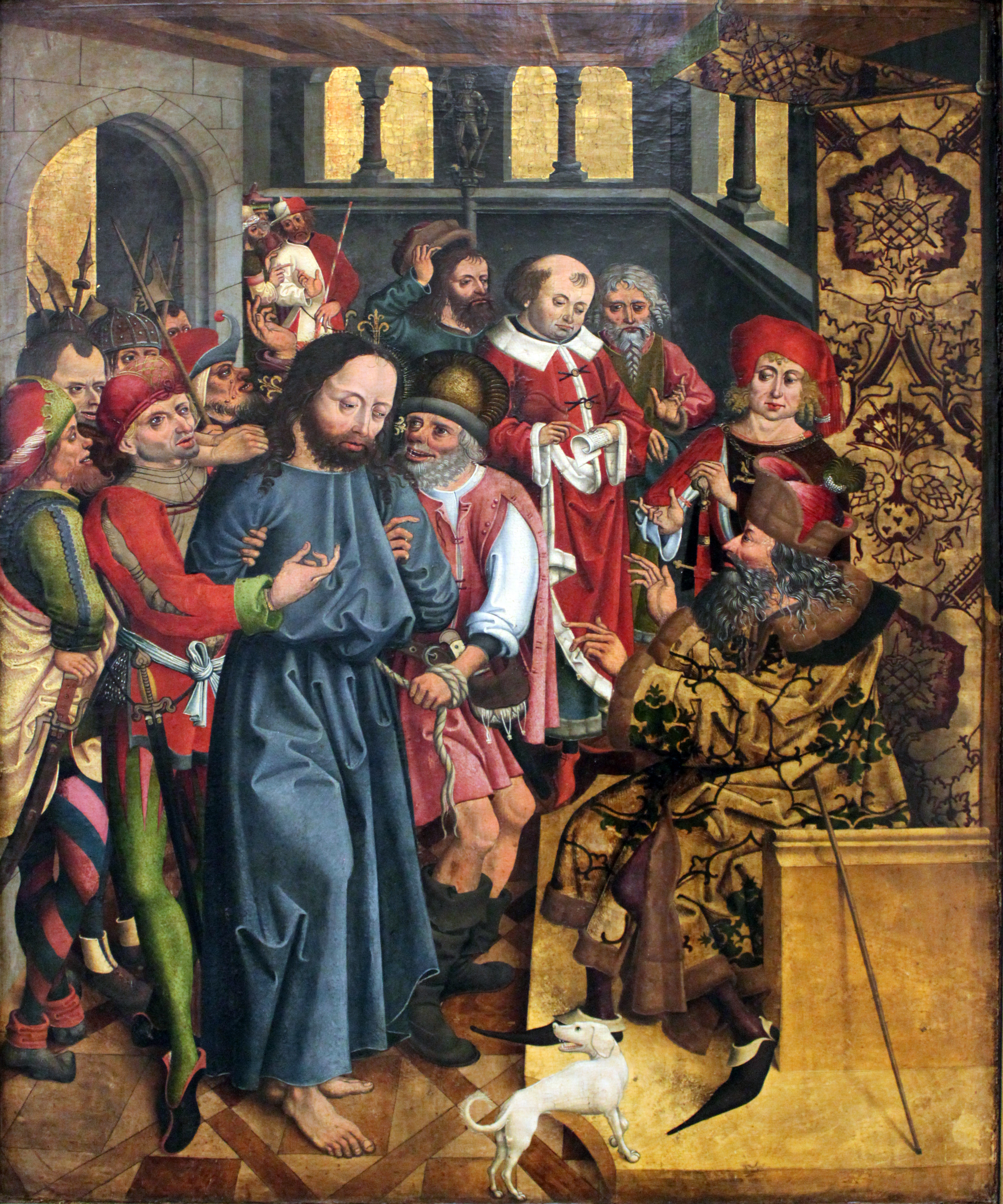
Christ before Caiaphas (1483)
