= Kaufungen =

- Municipality
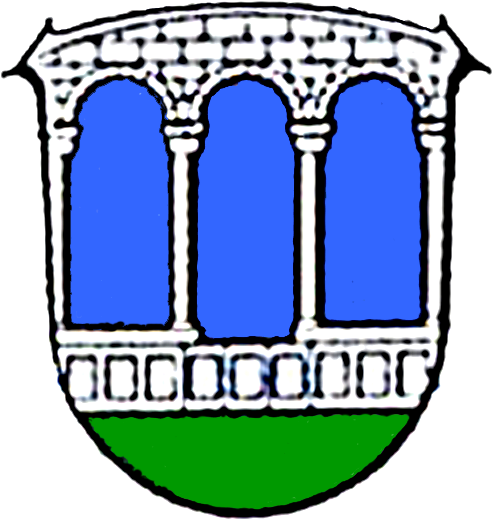
- Coat of arms

- Location of Kaufungen within Kassel district
- Interactive map of Kaufungen
- Location within Germany Location within Hesse
- Coordinates: 51°16′52″N 9°37′7″E
- Country: Germany
- State: Hesse
- Admin. region: Kassel
- District: Kassel
- Subdivisions: 3 districts

Government
  - Mayor (2022–28): Armin Roß (SPD)

Area
  - Total: 26.15 km^{2} (10.10 sq mi)
- Elevation: 210–250 m (690–820 ft)

Population (2025-12-31)
  - Total: 12,762
  - Density: 488.0/km^{2} (1,264/sq mi)
- Time zone: UTC+01:00 (CET)
  - Summer (DST): UTC+02:00 (CEST)
- Postal codes: 34260
- Dialling codes: 05605
- Vehicle registration: KS
- Website: www.kaufungen.eu

Kaufungen (German pronunciation: [ˈkaʊfʊŋən]) is a municipality in the district of Kassel, in Hesse, Germany. It is situated in the narrow valley of the river Losse, surrounded by the steep, wooded hills of the Kaufunger Wald, approx. 10 kilometres east of Kassel.

== Geography ==
=== Division of the municipality ===
The town is centred upon the historic villages of Oberkaufungen and Niederkaufungen, which are joined by modern housing developments to form a significant conurbation. The municipality of Kaufungen also includes Kaufungen-Papierfabrik, a largely industrial area on the eastern fringes of Kassel.

== History ==
The first historical reference to Coufunga was in 1011, when it was in use as a royal court. However, the extant St. Georgskapelle (St George's Chapel) is believed to be rather older, probably dating from the 10th century.

In 1017 Henry II, Holy Roman Emperor and his queen Cunigunde of Luxemburg founded Kaufungen Abbey, a Benedictine convent, perched on the steep edge of the Losse valley above what is now the centre of Oberkaufungen. Upon the death of her husband in 1024, Cunigunde entered the convent, and lived there until her death in 1033 or 1039. The Reformation brought the closure of the convent in 1527, but the large church (the Stiftskirche) is still standing and in use as a parish church today. At various points in its history, Kaufungen has been a local centre for mining, glass-making, charcoal burning, forestry and paper manufacture.

The farming settlement of Niederkaufungen, situated slightly downriver where the narrow Losse valley begins to open out into the wide, flat plain of the Fulda, is of more recent origin. In 1970 the villages of Nieder- and Oberkaufungen formally merged to form the present municipality. Since 1974, the Stiftskirche has played host to the Kaufunger Konzerte series of classical music concerts.

== Points of interest ==
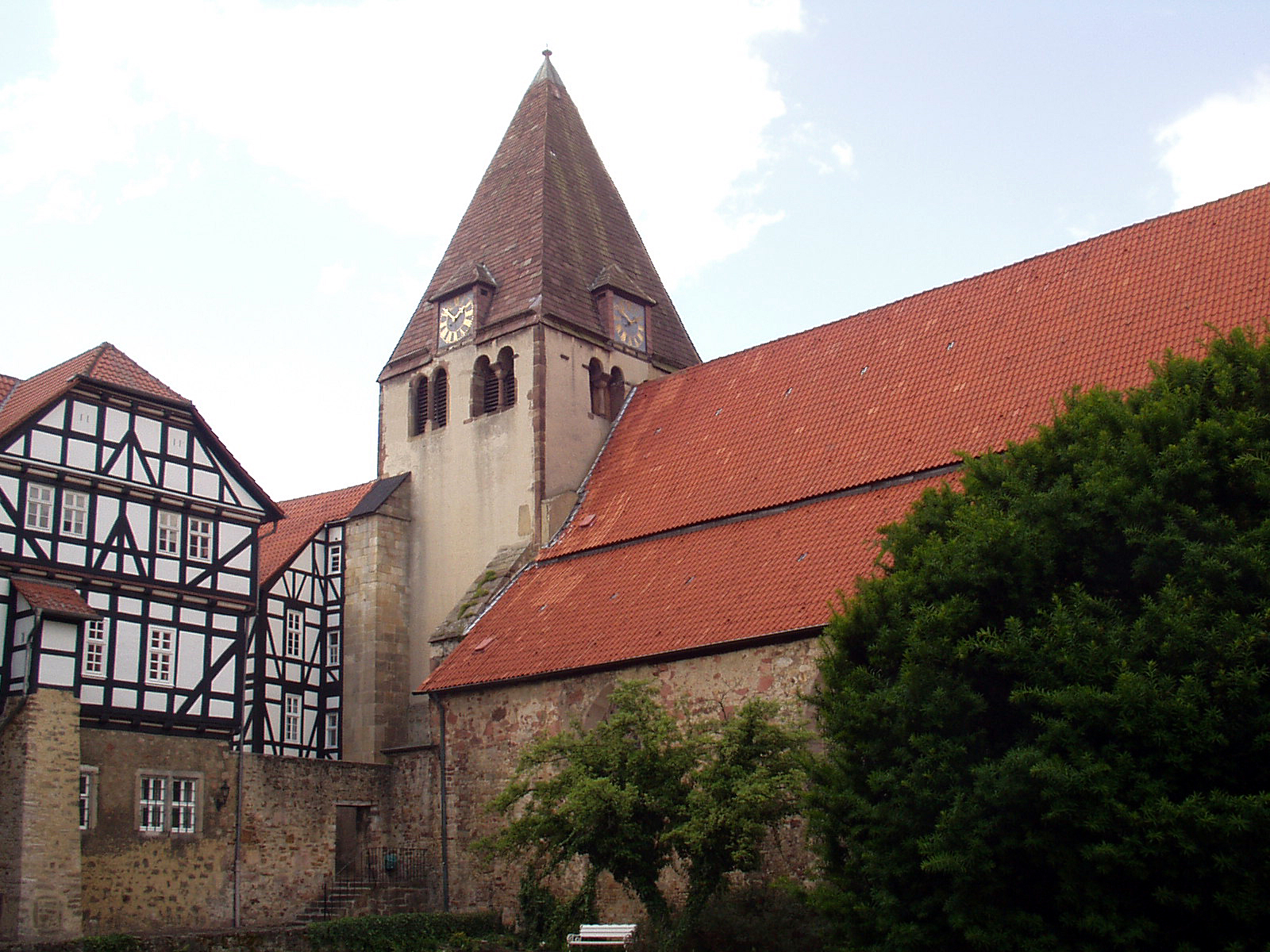
Stiftskiche Oberkaufungen

Both Nieder- and Oberkaufungen have historic village centres, with well-preserved half-timbered houses. The main attraction in Oberkaufungen is the early eleventh century Stiftskirche church which hosts regular classical music concerts. Just behind it lies in the smaller but older St George's Chapel, which is believed to date from the tenth century. Oberkaufungen also has two museums: the Alte Schule (Old School) museum documents the history of the town from the Middle Ages until the present day, while the Roßgang mining museum features reconstructions of historical mining scenes. Niederkaufungen is the site of the Kommune Niederkaufungen, one of Germany's largest intentional communities.

== Transport ==
The A7 Autobahn forms the border between Kaufungen-Papierfabrik and the city of Kassel. The B7 trunk road skirts the town on its way to Eisenach, and provides easy access to Nieder- and Oberkaufungen.

Kaufungen no longer has a passenger railway service, but instead is connected to Kassel's tram network. The frequent number 4 service runs directly to the city centre and onwards to the mainline railway station at Wilhelmshöhe. In the other direction, the tram line continues up the Losse valley through Helsa to its end in Hessisch Lichtenau. Through the centre of Niederkaufungen the railway and tram lines run together in an unusual six-rail gauntlet track configuration, which allows a narrow tram-train to reach the platform, but still allows space for mainline freight trains down the centre.

Kaufungen is situated on the Märchenlandweg (literally: fairy tale way), a long distance footpath and riding and cycle way.

== Twin towns ==
- Ale (Sweden), since 1992
- Bertinoro (Italy), since 1997
- Budești (Moldova), since 2004
