= Master L. Cz. =

German Renaissance printmaker

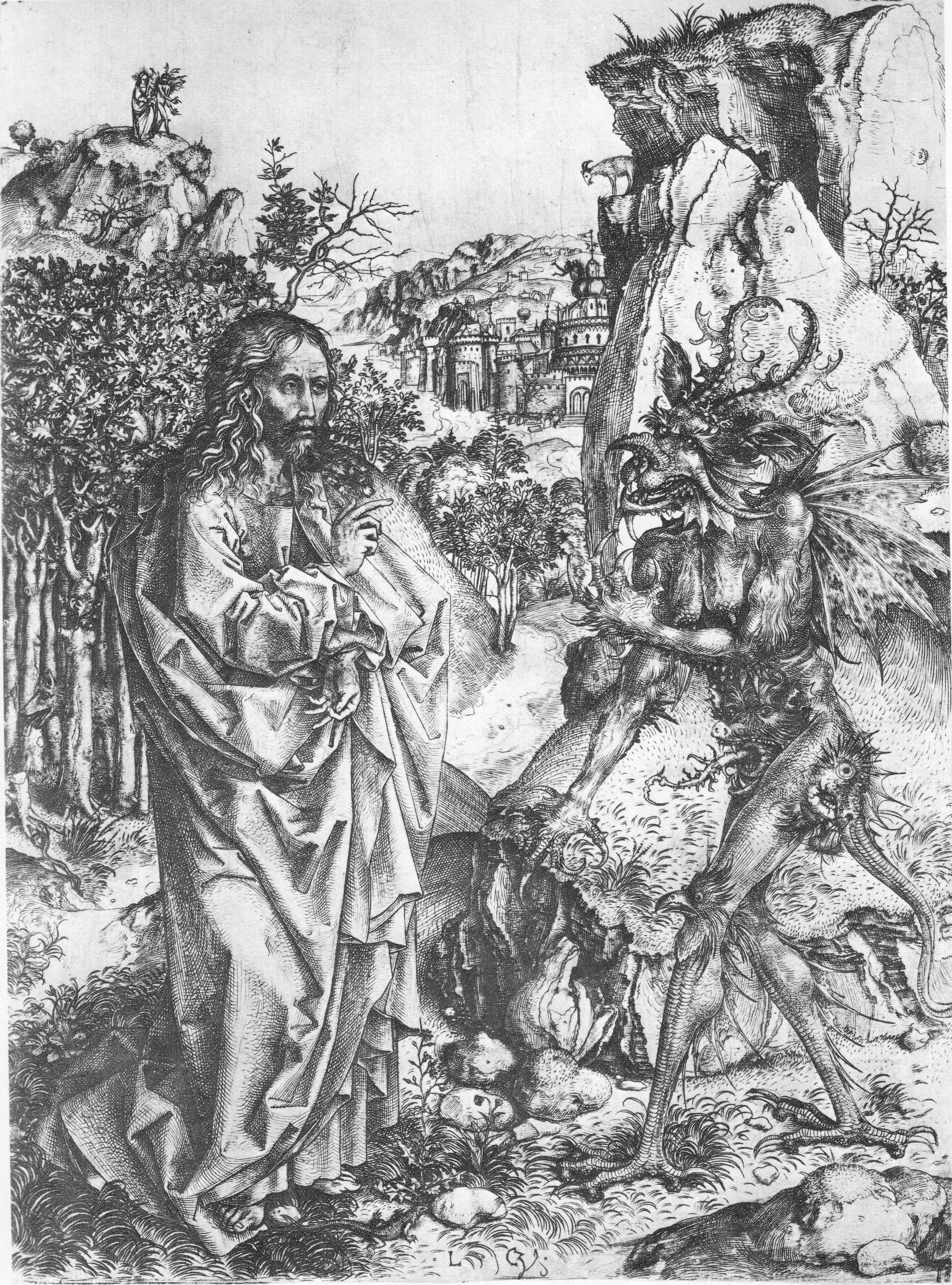
The Temptation of Christ (c. 1500), engraving on paper, 22.6 x 16.9 cm

Master L. Cz. (active c. 1480–1505) was an anonymous late 15th-century German Renaissance printmaker. Only twelve engravings by his hand are extant, but their virtuosity establishes him as a talented artist whose work marks a stylistic transition between that of Martin Schongauer and Albrecht Dürer.

== Identity ==
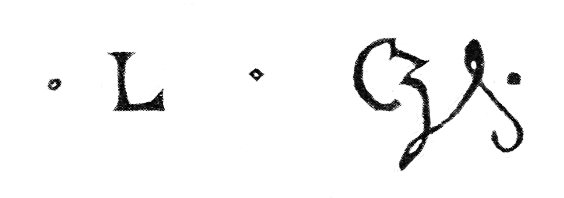
The monogram of Master L. Cz. as it appears in The Temptation of Christ.

19th-century scholars supposed that Master L. Cz. was a Dutch goldsmith by the name of Corneliszoon, as one of his few engravings is a design for an elaborate piece of jewelry, and z. is a Dutch abbreviation for zoon, meaning "son of". This theory was eventually rejected on the basis of his painterly style and German iconography, and the father of Lucas Cranach the Elder was proposed as another possibility. When it was discovered that Cranach's father's name was Hans Maler, Cranach himself was suspected.

While the identification with Cranach is still occasionally repeated, Master L. Cz. today is most often associated with the anonymous artist known as the Master of the Strache Altar, to whom four paintings of passion scenes have been ascribed. This artist has been identified with a fair amount of certainty as Lorenz Katzheimer, a Bamberg painter. Lorenz was probably a relative of Wolfgang Katzheimer, another Bamberg artist whose works show marked similarities to those of the Master of the Strache Altar.

== Work ==
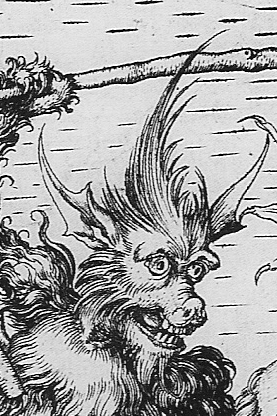
Martin Schongauer, detail from The Torment of Saint Anthony c. 1480–90

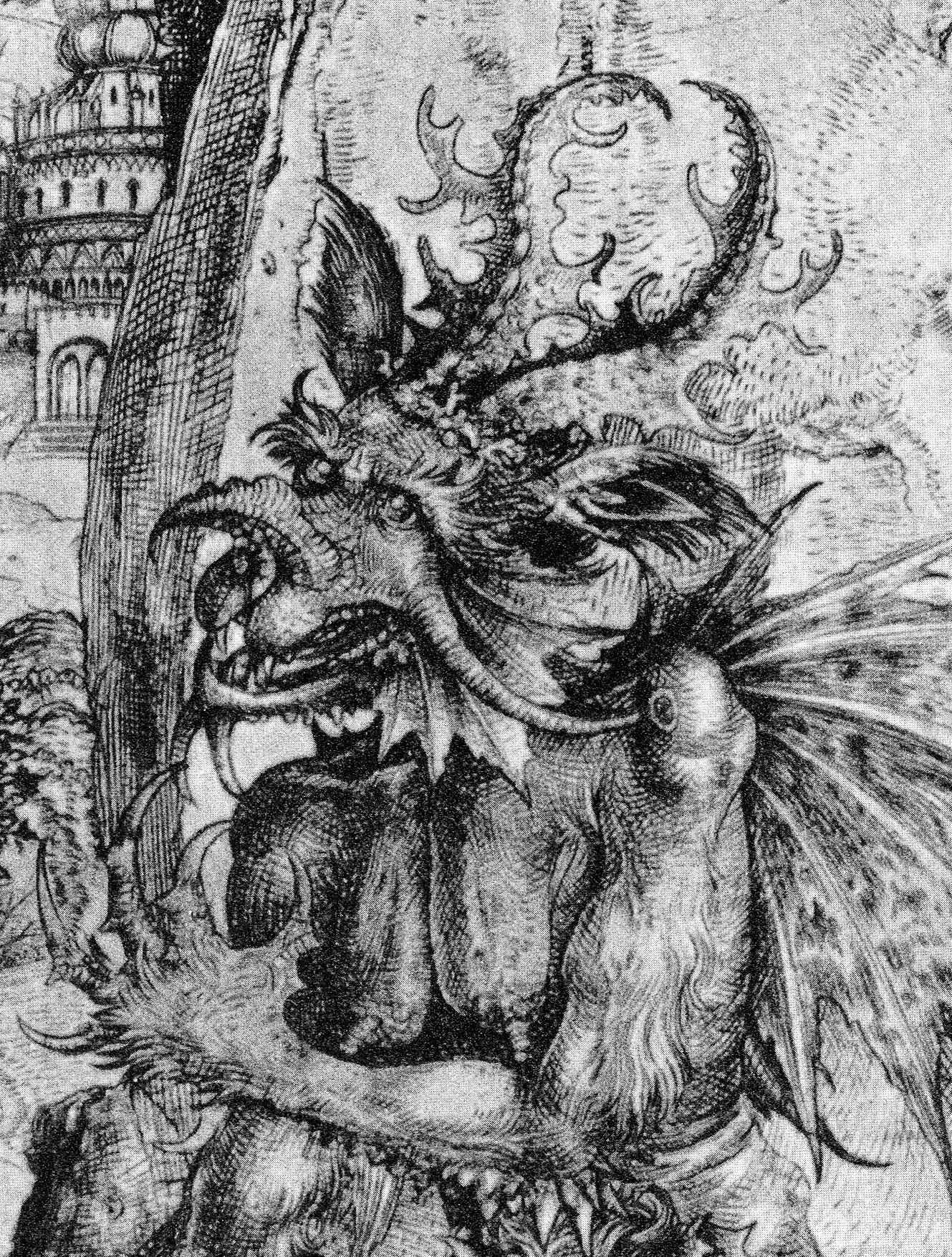
Master L. Cz., detail from The Temptation of Christ, c. 1500

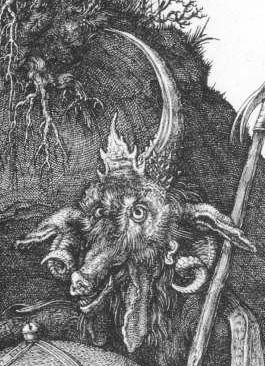
Albrecht Dürer, detail from Knight, Death, and the Devil, 1513

Twelve engravings by Master L. Cz. are extant; of these, ten are signed, and only two are dated. These works display the influence of Master E. S., the Housebook Master, and especially Martin Schongauer. While the earlier prints are more derivative of Schongauer, later prints, especially The Temptation of Christ, show a mature artist working in his own style.

The evolution of Master L. Cz.'s style can be broadly outlined through an examination of his engravings. Lady with a Servant in a Meadow (c. 1480–85) is an example of his earliest, least sophisticated work, in which the figures and drapery are "stiff", "arbitrary" renditions of Schongauer's more elegantly drawn women, and the stylized landscape the figures inhabit is derived from the work of Master E. S. Other early works show that L. Cz. soon began to move away from the "all-purpose medieval foliage" of Master E. S., placing the figures in Two Women on a Bridge and St. George and the Dragon (both c. 1485–90) in relatively naturalistic landscapes. Despite this development, Master L. Cz.'s engraving technique in the early works remained "harsh" and "severely methodical".

In the middle period Master L. Cz.'s technique became increasingly sophisticated as he continued to experiment with the integration of figures into landscape backgrounds. In Maiden Taming the Unicorn (dated 1492) the figures are deftly drawn and clearly stand out from the dense natural growth around them, as opposed to the earlier St. George and the Dragon, where the dense over-application of cross-hatching on the figures seems to flatten them into the background. The Sudarium Supported by St. Peter and St. Paul, his only other dated work (1497), is also from this period.

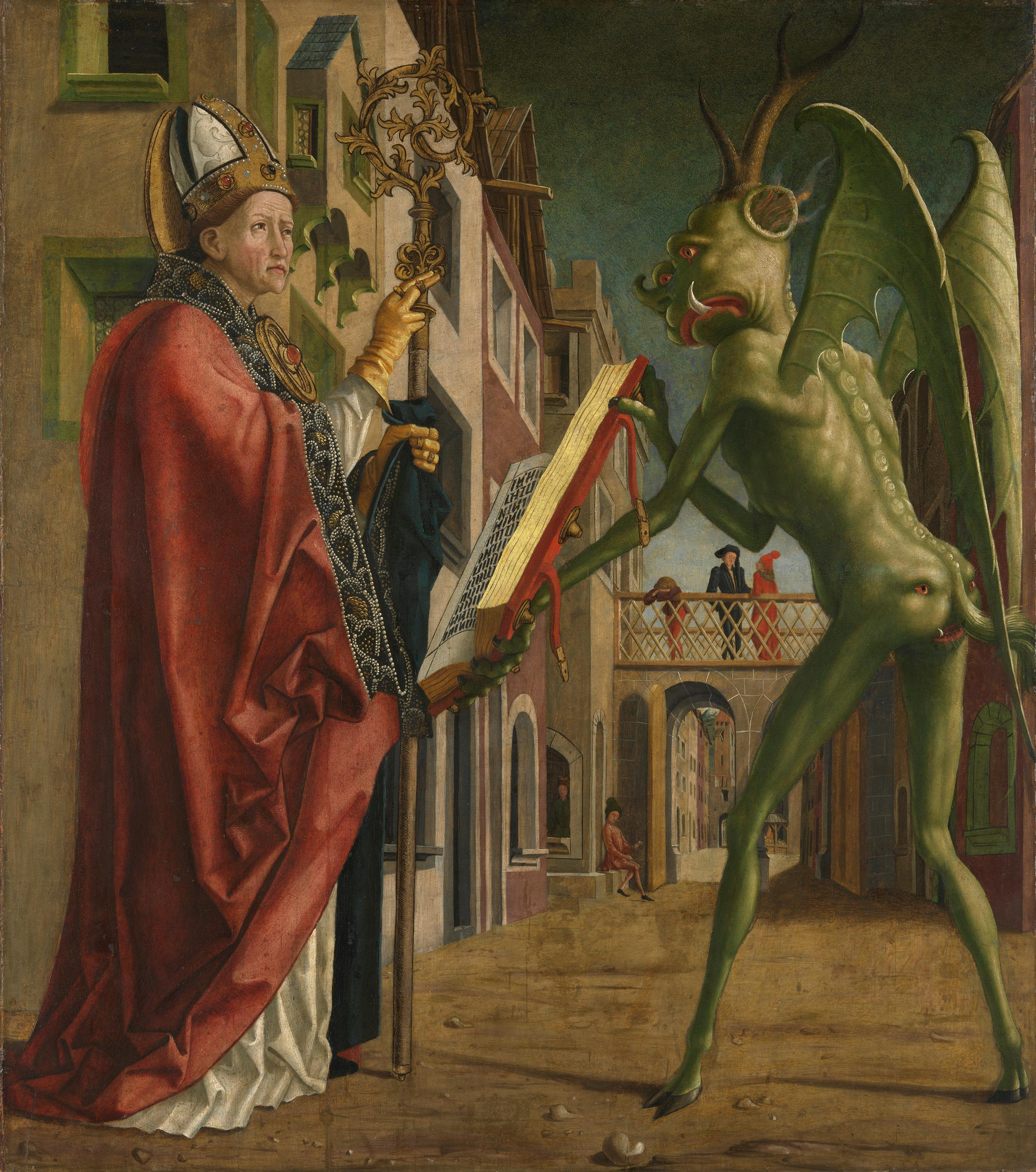
Michael Pacher, Saint Wolfgang and the Devil, oil on panel, c. 1471–75. Alte Pinakothek, Munich

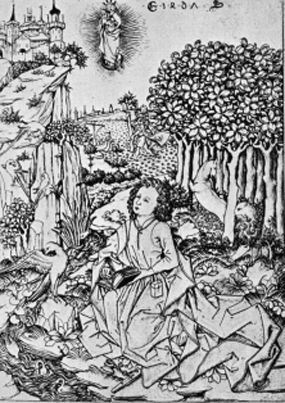
Master E. S., St. John on Patmos engraving, 1467.

The final period includes only two engravings, The Temptation of Christ and Entry into Jerusalem, but these are Master L. Cz.'s best and largest works. In contrast to the awkwardness of his early works Master L. Cz. now displayed "enormous virtuosity with the burin in creating varied effects of texture".

The Temptation of Christ is his most famous and common print, existing in about 20 impressions. It draws inspiration from the compositions of Michael Pacher and Master E. S., but marks a step forward from these models by integrating the monumental confrontation between good and evil into a fully realized landscape setting apparently observed from nature. In particular, the design of Satan recalls the demons from Schongauer's The Torment of St. Anthony while providing a notable precedent for Albrecht Dürer's depiction of the devil in Knight, Death, and the Devil.

Beyond providing specific models for later artists, the sheer size, ambition, and technical inventiveness of Master L. Cz.'s late work suggests his most important contribution: that he "developed a new concept of engraving as a medium capable of rivaling painting."

=== List of works ===
The dates given are those according to Shestack.

Engraving	Name	Year	Technique	Dimensions	# of Impressions Extant	Notes
	Lady with a Servant in a Meadow	ca. 1480–85	Engraving		2	
	Two Women on a Bridge	ca. 1485–90	Engraving	51 x 40 mm	1	
	St. George and the Dragon	ca. 1485–90	Engraving	99 x 125 mm (sheet size)	3	
	Madonna and Child in a Window; Crowned by Two Angels	ca. 1485–90	Engraving		2	Second state
	Flight into Egypt	ca. 1490	Engraving		6	
	Maiden Taming the Unicorn	dated 1492	Engraving		2	
	Crucifixion	ca. 1490–92	Engraving	approx. 60 mm in diameter	2	
	Madonna Nursing	ca. 1490–92	Engraving	approx. 60 mm in diameter	2	
	The Sudarium Supported by St. Peter and St. Paul	dated 1497	Engraving		2	
	St. Catherine	ca. 1497	Engraving		3	
	Entry into Jerusalem	ca. 1500	Engraving	221 x 168 mm	11	
	The Temptation of Christ	ca. 1500	Engraving	226 x 169 mm	20	
