= Kaufungen Abbey =

Coordinates: 51°16′48″N 9°38′03″E

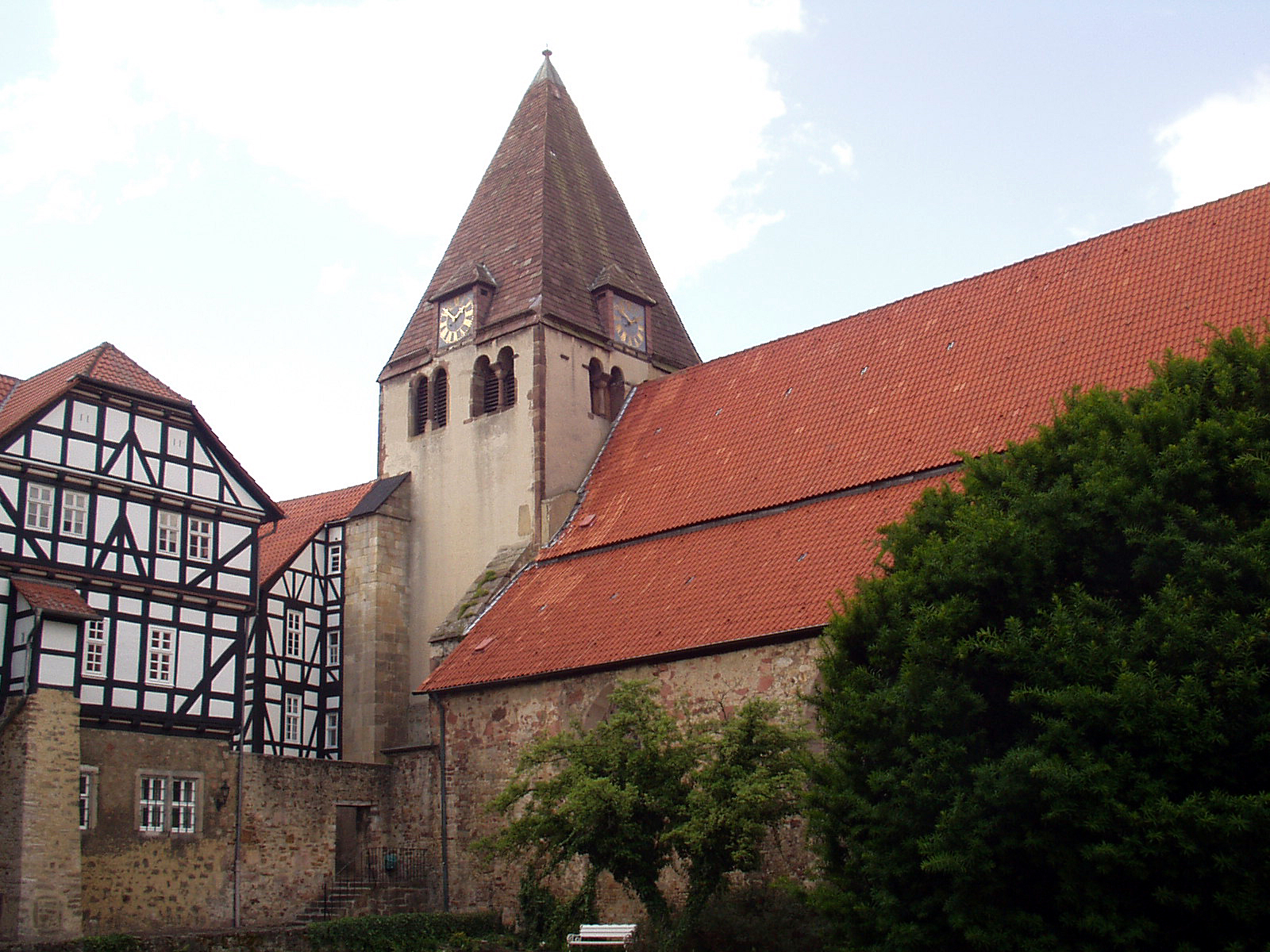
Abbey church ("Stiftskirche"), Kaufungen

Kaufungen Abbey (German: Kloster Kaufungen) was a Benedictine nunnery founded in 1017 by the Empress Cunigunde of Luxembourg, wife of Henry II, Holy Roman Emperor, located in Kaufungen in Hessen, Germany.

== History ==
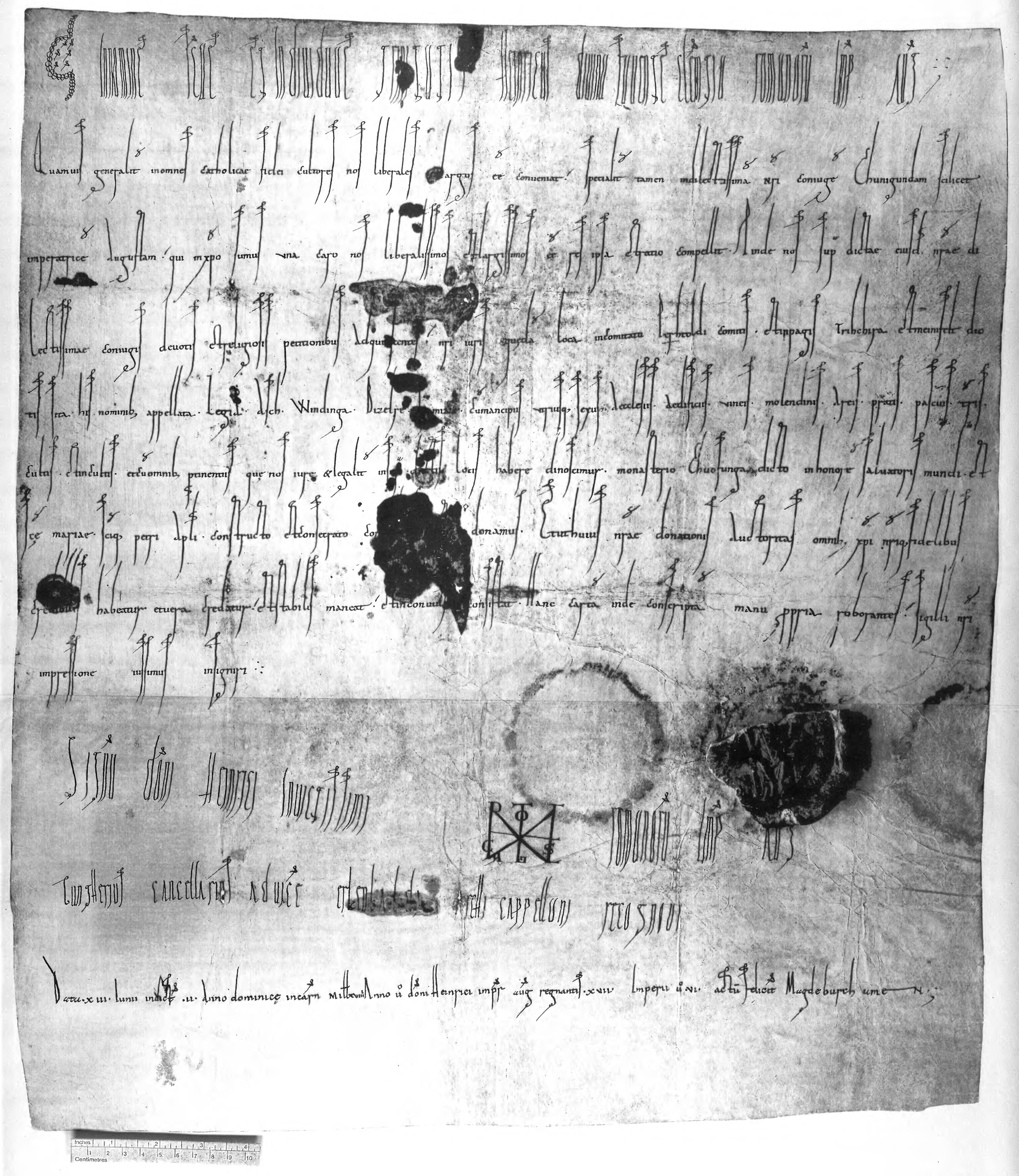
Kaufungen deed of gift of Henry II, 1019

In May 1017 Cunigunde was staying on the imperial estate of Kaufungen when, according to Thietmar of Merseburg, she became seriously ill and vowed to found a monastery if she recovered. She did so and her husband Henry endowed the new foundation in 1019.

King Henry granted to the nuns of Kaufungen, the privilege to organize a weekly market each Saturday, and a fair on the Feast of John the Baptist, and another of the Feast of the Exaltation of the Holy Cross.

After the death of Henry in 1024, Cunigunde, who was later canonized as well as her husband, became a nun in the new Benedictine monastery, where she died around 1033.

The abbey church was consecrated on 13 July 1025. In 1089, the nunnery became an Imperial abbey, territorially and judicially independent, subject only to the Holy Roman Emperor .

The "Vögte" (advocates, or lords protectors) of Kaufungen Abbey were the Counts of Maden.

During the 12th century, the abbey was transformed to house a community of secular canonesses, becoming a home for unmarried female members of the nobility (Frauenstift). It continued in this form until 1509, when, at the instigation of William II, Landgrave of Hesse, the abbey was returned to the Benedictine Order, under the authority of the Bursfeld Congregation. The canonesses were formed into Benedictines by nuns from Gehrden Abbey.

In 1532, during the Protestant Reformation, Landgrave Philip I of Hesse appropriated it and gave it, together with Wetter Abbey, to the Hessische Ritterschaft (Hessian Knighthood, an association of noble families for the purpose of mutual help) for the care and shelter of female members of those families belonging to it.

As the Ritterschaftliches Stift Kaufungen it still exists today.

== Church ==
The abbey church, now known as the "Stiftskirche", was dedicated on 13 July 1025. It is now used as the parish church and is counted as the most significant structure of the late Ottonian period in north Hesse. In the westwork the Imperial gallery ("Kaiserempore") was re-discovered in 1938. The church hosts regular classical music concerts.
