= Kommune Niederkaufungen =

Intentional community in Hesse, Germany

Coordinates: 51.2854157°N 9.6018928°E

Kommune Niederkaufungen is one of the largest intentional communities in Germany. Founded in 1986, it is an egalitarian, left-wing, income-sharing commune with consensus decision-making. It is situated in a complex of former farm buildings in the historic centre of the village of Niederkaufungen (Kaufungen), seven kilometres from the city of Kassel (Hessen). It has grown from 15 founder members to 62 adults and nearly 20 children and teenagers (2009). It is a member of "Kommuja", the German network of political communes and egalitarian communities.

== Core principles ==
The Kommune Niederkaufungen has a set of five main core principles. These were formulated in a pamphlet in 1983, the "Grundsatzpapier". They are:

- left-wing politics,
- consensus decision making,
- a completely communal income and asset sharing economy,
- a reduction of hierarchical and patriarchal structures,
- work in collectives.

Although not explicitly listed as a core principle in the "Grundsatzpapier", ecological ideas have been important since the start. A wish to become ecologically and economically sustainable is expressed in the pamphlet and is seen as the sixth commune core principle. In addition, the wish to find a site near but not in a city was expressed in this "vision document", as was the further aim to reach a membership of 100 adult members.

== Work collectives ==
Nearly all members of the commune work in commune owned collectives. These include

- a carpentry and joinery workshop,
- a seminar centre, offering courses on communal themes, (Tagungshaus Niederkaufungen)
- a group of non-violent communication (NVC) trainers,
- a building firm, (KOMM-BAU)
- a smithing / metal workshop,
- an organic food catering firm, (Komm-Menu)
- a certified "Bioland" organic market garden with farm shop,(Gemüsebau Kollektiv "Rote Rübe")
- a fruit / orchard collective (Obst-Manufactur)
- an EU certified organic dairy farm with cheese making, (Hof Birkengrund)
- a kindergarten, (KITA "Die Wühlmäuse")
- an administration and community consultancy group, (KOMM-RAT)
- a day-care centre for old people, (Tagespflege Lossetal)

Each work collective decides independently on work hours, work responsibilities and holidays.

== Living groups ==
Members of the commune live in eleven living groups of between four and ten people. The others are mixed. Each individual communard has her or his own room. Other facilities in the living group (bathrooms, common rooms, tea kitchens etc.) are shared. Each living group organises its own household affairs. Most living groups have regular group meetings and some take holidays together.

== Environmental technology ==
As part of the attempt to reduce the ecological footprint of the commune, various technological measures have been taken in the last few years. These are:

- Cogeneration. Construction of a gas-fueled domestic combined heat and power (CHP) plant,
- two large log burning central heating plants for winter heating, using left-over regional firewood,
- Installation of a building integrated photovoltaic (BIPV) plant with c. 59 kilowatt maximum output. (This is about equal to the electricity use of 12 four-person households.),
- Construction of a solar panel on a residential building for warm water in summer,
- Rainwater harvesting: Two rainwater cisterns containing up to 41,000 litres, for use in washing machines, toilets and gardens,
- Various energy and water saving devices have also been installed, including energy saving light-bulbs (compact fluorescent lamps) and domestic appliances, water saving devices on taps, showers and toilets, thermal insulation on and in buildings, replacement of single glazing with double glazing.
