= Cunigunde of Luxembourg =

Holy Roman Empress from 1014 to 1024; Roman Catholic saint

Saint Cunigunde of Luxembourg OSB
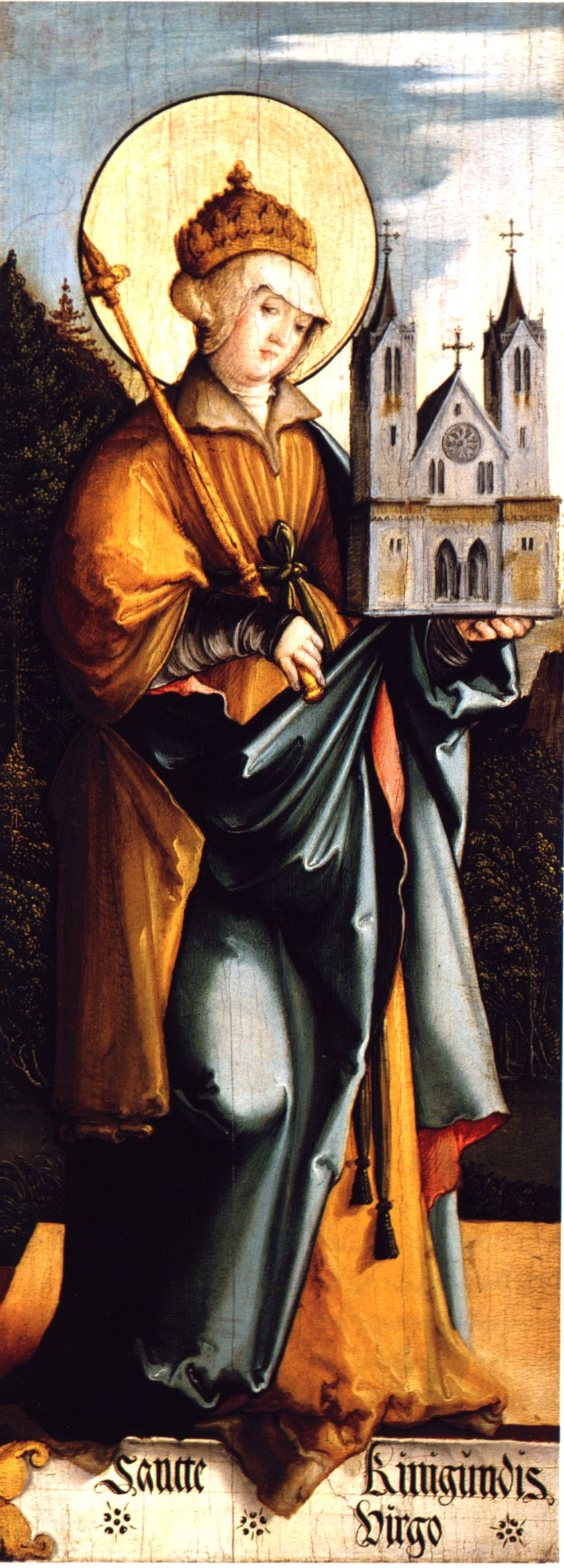
- Saint Cunigunda; painting by the Master of Meßkirch, c.1535/40, housed at the Staatsgalerie Stuttgart.

Empress of the Holy Roman Empire, Right-Believing, Saint Nun
- Born: c. 975
- Died: 3 March 1040
- Venerated in: Catholic Church; Eastern Orthodox Church
- Canonized: 29 March 1200, Rome by Pope Innocent III
- Major shrine: Bamberg Cathedral, Bamberg, Germany
- Feast: 3 March
- Attributes: An empress in imperial robes, sometimes holding a church.
- Patronage: Patroness of Luxembourg, and the Archdiocese of Bamberg, Germany

Cunigunde of Luxembourg, OSB (German: Kunigunde) (c. 975 – 3 March 1040), also called Cunegundes, Cunegunda, and Cunegonda and, in Latin, Cunegundis or Kinigundis, was Empress of the Holy Roman Empire by marriage to Holy Roman Emperor Henry II. She ruled as interim regent after the death of her spouse in 1024. She is a saint and the patroness of Luxembourg; her feast day is 3 March.

== Life ==
Cunigunde was one of eleven children born to Siegfried I of Luxembourg (922 – 15 August 998) and a woman called Hedwig. Numerous genealogists have tried to find out which Hedwig it is; there are different views. One of the most famous theses regarding her identity is from Joseph Depoin, who claims that Hedwig is the daughter of Duke Gilbert of Lorraine and his wife Gerberga of Saxony, the daughter of Henry I. If this is correct, then Cunigunde married her distant cousin, but Henry II was strongly against consanguineous marriage, so it can be assumed that this is not the case. It can also often be read that she is the daughter of Berthold of Schweinfurt from the House of Babenberg and Eilika of Walbeck, daughter of Count Lothar. Cunigunde's paternal grandmother, also called Cunigunde, was a Carolingian. So Cunigunde of Luxembourg was a seventh-generation descendant of Charlemagne. She married King Henry in 999. It is said that she had long wanted to be a nun, and that her marriage to Henry II was a spiritual one (also called a "white marriage"); that is, they married for companionship alone, and by mutual agreement did not consummate their relationship. It has been claimed that Cunigunde made a vow of virginity with Henry's consent prior to their marriage. The truth of this is debatable; while the couple were both certainly childless, it is supposed by some authors that later hagiographers mistakenly construed the fact to imply a virginal marriage. Others, however, accept that the marriage was purely platonic.

During their marriage, her husband, Henry II, then only Duke of Bavaria, was crowned king of Germany ("Rex Romanorum"). The couple were crowned on 9 July 1002 in Mainz, in present-day Germany, by Willigis, Archbishop of Mainz. Cunigunde was crowned on 10 August 1002 in Paderborn, in present-day Germany, also by Willigis. It is the first known crowning of a German queen. Her predecessors were married to a king who was already crowned and therefore were not crowned alone. They directly were crowned empress in Rome. Later, her husband was also crowned as king of Italy on 15 May 1004 in Pavia, Italy, but no evidence has been given of her being crowned as queen of Italy.

It appears that Cunigunde was active politically. The title consors regni (meaning "partner in the rule") for the wives of the Ottonian rulers was often used in charters. In one-third of Henry's remaining charters, Cunigunde emerges as an advocate or initiator. As the closest adviser of her husband, she took part in Imperial councils. She is also reported to have exerted an influence on her husband in his endowments of land to the Church. These included the cathedral and monastery at Bamberg, Bavaria, in present-day Germany.

Cunigunde traveled with her husband to Rome for his coronation as Holy Roman Emperor ("Romanorum Imperator") as was the tradition for the King of Germany, and was crowned as Holy Roman Empress with him on 14 February 1014 in St. Peter's Basilica, Rome, receiving together with Henry the Imperial Crown from the hands of Pope Benedict VIII. During her reign she suffered from a grave illness and made a vow that if she were to regain her health, she would found a Benedictine monastery at Kassel. Upon her recovery, she kept her oath and work began on the building; however, Henry died in 1024 before it was finished. Upon his death, Cunigunde was obliged to assume the office of Regent of the Empire. This she did with her brother, and later handed over the Imperial insignia when Conrad II was elected to succeed her late husband on 8 September 1024.

== Religious life and death ==
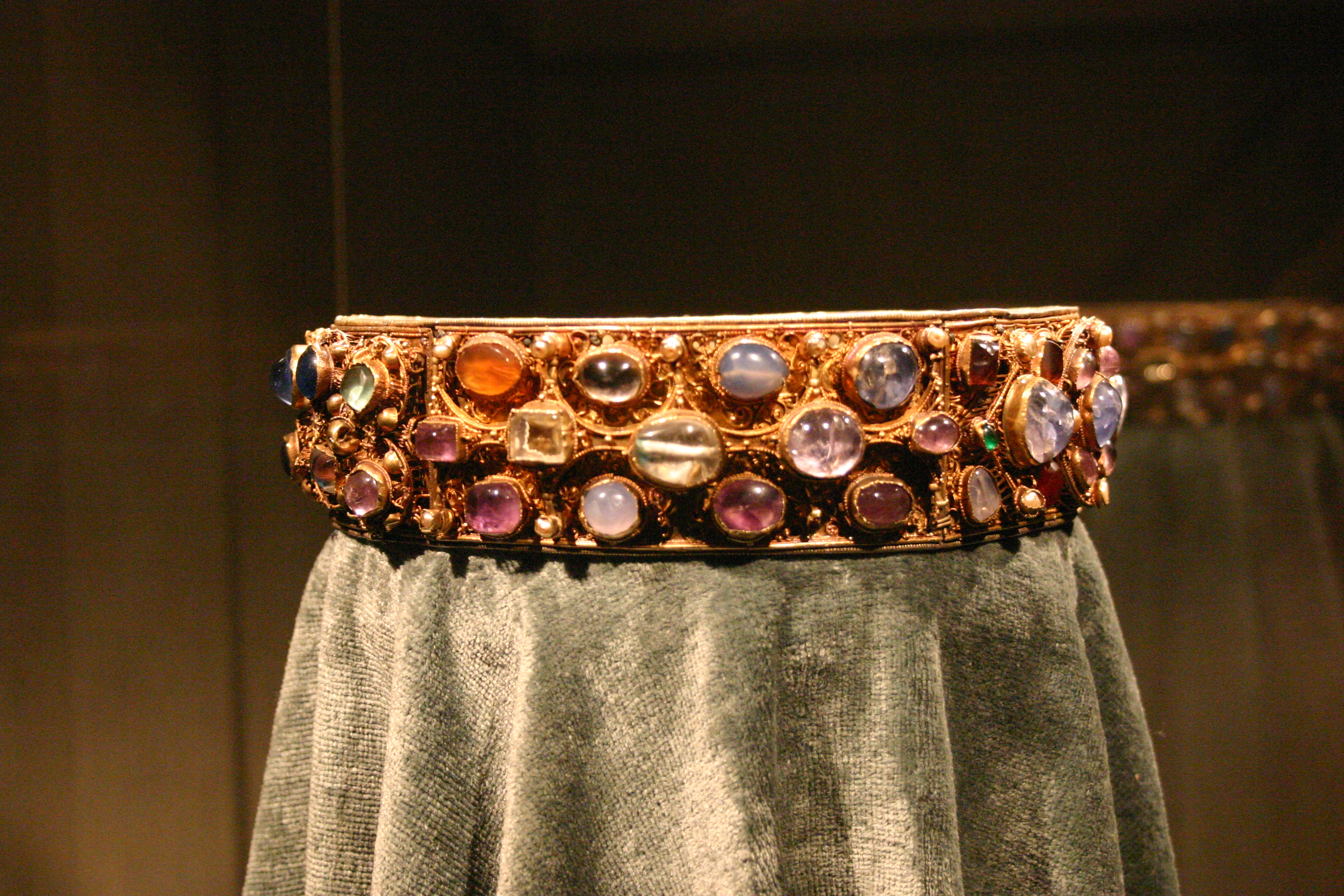
Crown of the Empress Cunigunde

As a widow, Cunigunde was left comparatively poor, owing to the enormous wealth given away by her and Henry in charitable works.

In 1025, exactly one year after the death of her husband, Cunigunde retired to Kaufungen Abbey, in Hesse, Germany, where she entered the monastery of Benedictine nuns she had founded there. At the dedication of the monastery, she offered a relic of the True Cross, removed her regalia, and donned the habit of the nun. There she remained at the monastery, performing charitable works, caring for the sick and devoting her time to prayer. She died on 3 March 1040 at Kaufungen. She was buried at Bamberg Cathedral beside her husband, but may have been buried elsewhere first and then re-interred at the Cathedral in 1201 after her canonization.

== Canonization and veneration ==
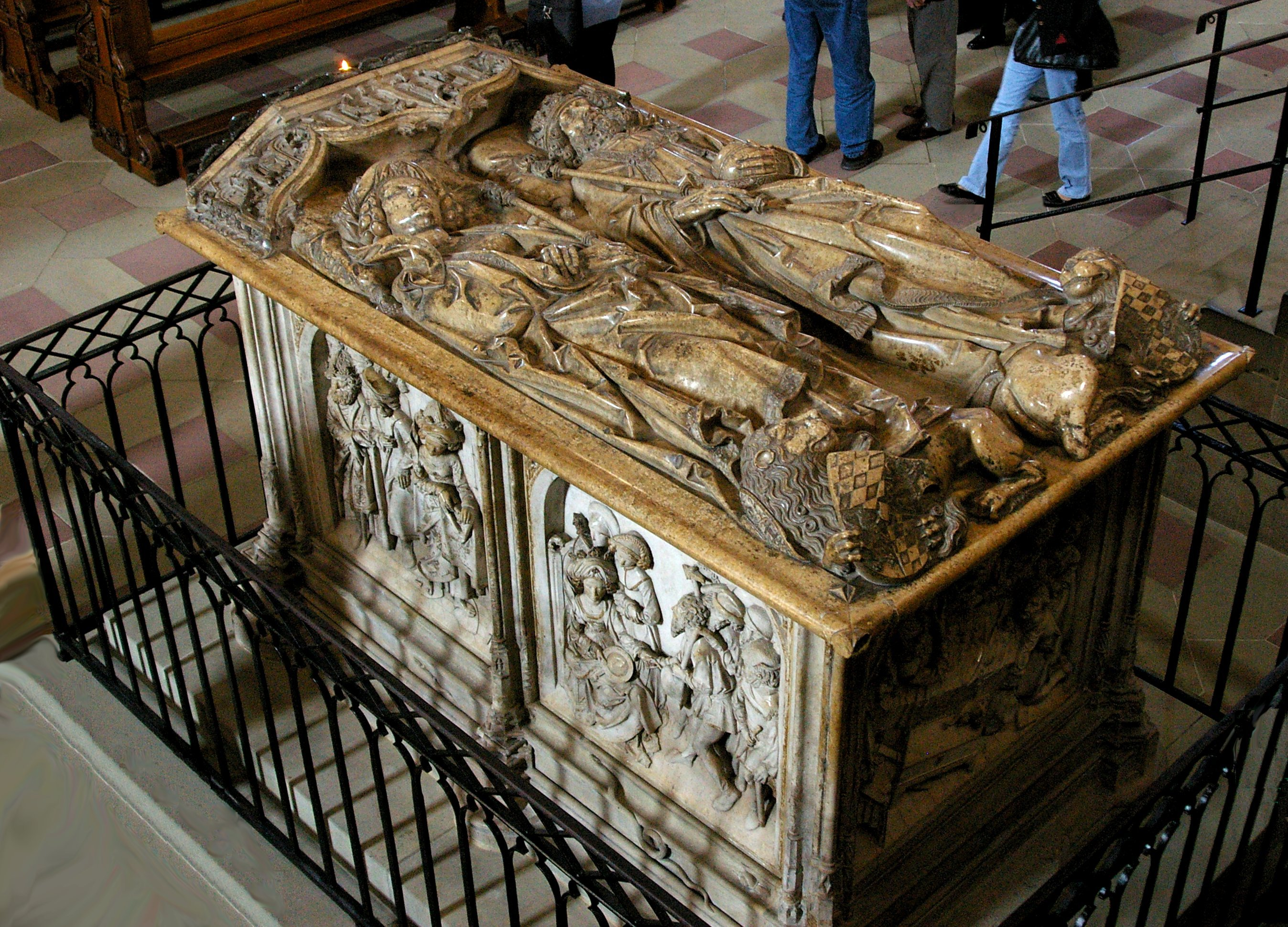
Emperor Henry II and Empress Cunigunde's tomb by Tilman Riemenschneider.

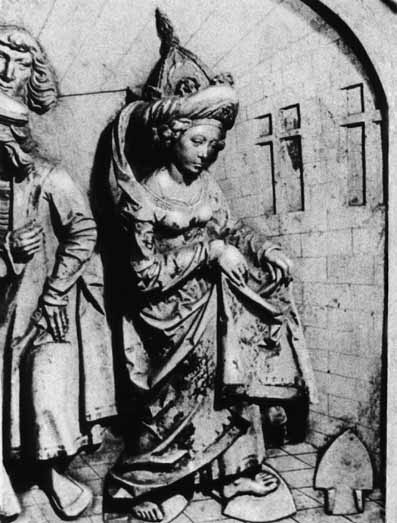
After being accused of adultery Cunigunde proved her innocence by walking over red-hot ploughshares.

Cunigunde was canonised by Pope Innocent III on 29 March 1200, 53 years after the canonization of her husband Henry II in July 1147. To prepare a case for canonization her biography was compiled. This and the Papal bull for her canonization relate several instances of miracles to have been worked by the Empress.

One of these relates how, when calumniators accused her of scandalous conduct, her innocence was signally vindicated by divine providence as she walked over pieces of flaming irons without injury, to the great joy of her husband, the Emperor. Another tells of Cunigunde falling asleep one night and being carried into bed. Her maid also fell asleep and a candle set the bed on fire. The blaze awoke both of them and upon Cunigunde executing the Sign of the Cross, the fire immediately disappeared, saving them from burning. A final legend tells of one of Cunigunde's nieces, Judith, the abbess of Kaufungen Abbey. A frivolous young woman, Judith preferred feasting and carousing with the young sisters to the Sabbath rituals. Cunigunde remonstrated with her, to little effect. Finally Cunigunde became so vexed with her niece that she slapped her across the face; the marks remained on her face for the rest of her life, serving as a warning to those of the community who would not take their vows or observances seriously.

Cunigunde is widely venerated. As well as churches that are dedicated to her, such as St. Cunegunda Church in Detroit, USA, Poland, and the Archdiocese of Bamberg, Germany, she is the Patroness of Luxembourg, where the parish church of Clausen (which has on Sundays and holy days a celebration of the Tridentine Mass) is dedicated to her.

Saint Cunigunde of Luxembourg is venerated in Eastern Orthodox Church on 3 March.

== Reception and iconography ==
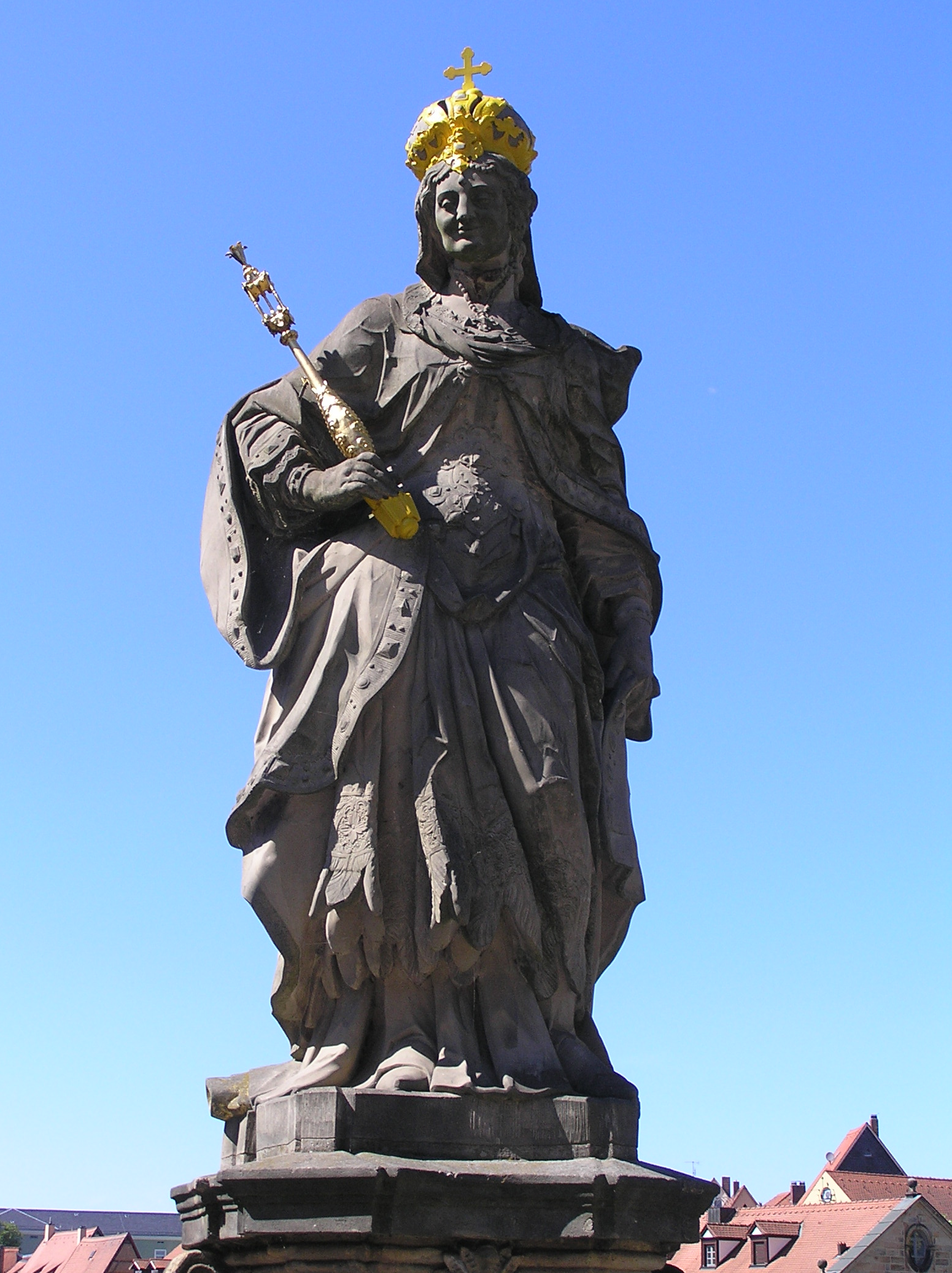
Statue of Empress Kunigunde on the Lower Bridge in Bamberg

As well as in his political life, Henry II often included his wife in his imperial representation.

Her participation in the reign of her husband is underlined on the dedication picture of the Pericopes of Henry II. The couple commissioned the book in 1012 to the monks on the island Reichenau in Lake Constance, which was a leading center for book illumination at the time. With its precious cover and the 28 full-page miniatures, this is one of the most important works of book art at the time. On the dedication picture, the coronation of the couple by Jesus Christ is shown. The couple is led by the Apostles Peter and Paul. Henry is shown with an orb and scepter. The role of Cunigunde, who is represented in the same size as her husband, consists in the hand movement, pointing directly to Christ. This active hand movement can be seen as a sign of her political action readiness. In the accompanying dedicatory poem, she is referred to as co-regent (conregnans). Again, the aspect of the ruler couple moves forward, she appears as a partner in the rule of Henry II.

After her canonization, representations of her as a saint can be seen in ecclesiastical art, especially in the Franconian area. As the founder of the Dome and Diocese of Bamberg, she is to be seen together with her husband in the group of figures of the doorcase of the Adamspforte at Bamberg Cathedral. This doorcase, created in 1235, is the most significant monumental depiction of Cunigunde in the High Middle Ages. On the left are Stephen, Cunigunde and Henry, on the right opposite side, Peter, Adam and Eve can be seen. Stephen, the first Christian martyr is in the guise of a deacon. He stands next to the Empress. As a donor, she is holding the model of a church in the right hand, as in many representations. With her left hand, she is pointing to her husband, Henry II, the founder of the diocese.

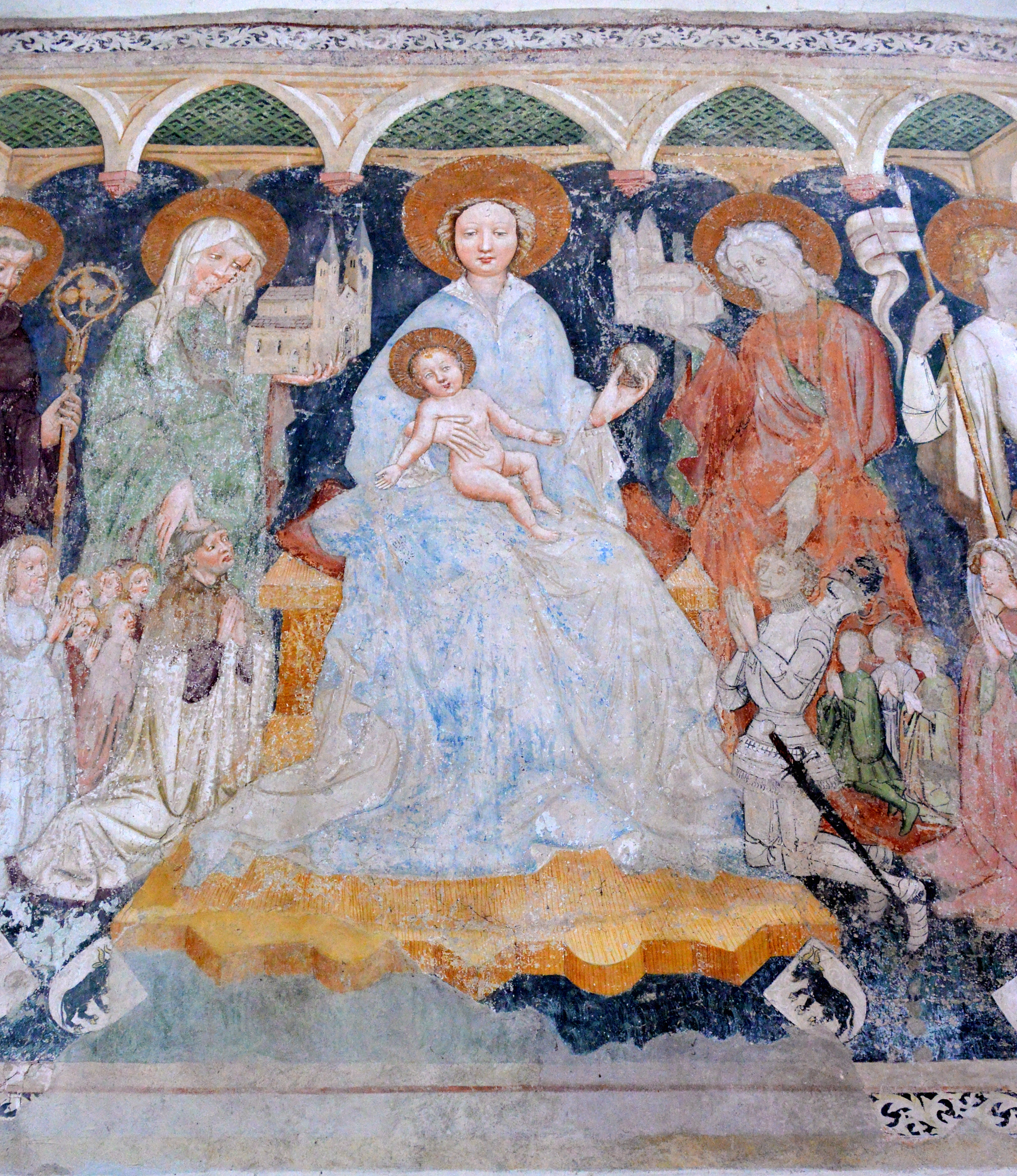
Gothic fresco of Sacra Conversazione, Carinthia. From left to right, the fresco depicts Saint Giles, Saint Hemma of Gurk, The Madonna and Child, Saint Cunigunde and Saint George

Cunigunde's usual attribute is a ploughshare. According to the legend, she walked over glowing ploughshares without being hurt. This scene is shown on the Tumba made of limestone at Bamberg Cathedral, created in the years 1499-1513 by Tilman Riemenschneider, the most important German sculptor of the time. The double tomb of the imperial couple shows the lying couple with two lions and the Bavarian-Luxembourgish double coat of arms with blue-silver diamonds and the Roude Leiw at their feet. In such tomb effigies, the lion, as a symbol of strength, is usually reserved for men. At the feet of women, there usually is a dog, as a sign of loyalty. The fact, that Cunigunde was also assigned a lion, is a reference of posterity to the duchess, queen and empress, who exercises her own sovereign rights. The Roude Leiw (meaning "red lion" in Luxembourgish) is also the coat of arms of Luxembourg since 1235–1239. Three of the four sides of the Tumba are decorated with scenic reliefs and architectural ornaments. Those depict events from the legends of the saints. Cunigunde is depicted as a miraculous saint in the "Ploughshare test" and the "Key miracle".

In Luxembourg, where she is the only female saint, there is the parish Church of Saint Cunigunde in Clausen, which was consecrated in 1865 and decorated with murals depicting scenes from the life of Cunigunde in 1906. In 1959, the Cunigunde bell (Cloche St. Cunégonde) was consecrated. In addition to a wooden sculpture of the saints, a tooth relic of Cunigunde is revered in this church. There is also an octagonal Cunigunde Chapel in Heiderscheidergrund (Heischtergronn), built in 1848–1852. A statue is located there to the left of the main altar. There are two churches consecrated to her in the parish of Park Hosingen, the chapel of the village of Oberschlinder dedicated to her and the Archangel Michael in 1875, and the church of Hoscheid-Dickt in 1852, which is also the oldest church in Luxembourg dedicated to the Holy Empress.

== See also ==
- Plenitudo potestatis, the first mediaeval instance of which is recorded in the Papal bull for Cunigunde's canonization.
- List of Catholic saints
- List of Holy Roman Empresses
- Saint Cunigunde of Luxembourg, patron saint archive

Royal titles
Preceded by Theophanu	Queen consort of Germany; 1002–1024	Succeeded by Gisela of Swabia
Preceded by Theophanu	Holy Roman Empress; 1014–1024	Succeeded by Gisela of Swabia
